Valentino Rossi (born 16 February 1979) is an Italian former professional motorcycle road racer and nine-time Grand Prix motorcycle racing World Champion. Nicknamed The Doctor, he is widely considered to be one of the greatest motorcycle racers of all time, with some labelling him as the greatest ever. He has nine Grand Prix World Championships to his name, seven of which were in the premier 500cc/MotoGP class. He holds the record of most premier class victories, with 89 victories to his name. He won premier class World Championships with both Honda and Yamaha. He is also the only road racer to have competed in 400 or more Grands Prix, and rode with the number 46 for his entire career.

After graduating to the premier class in 2000, Rossi won the final 500cc World Championship (becoming the last satellite rider to win the top-class title to date) and the 8 Hours of Suzuka with Honda in 2001. He also won MotoGP World Championships with the factory Honda Team in 2002 and 2003 and continued his run of back-to-back championships by winning the 2004 and 2005 titles after leaving Honda to join Yamaha. He lost the 2006 title with a crash in the final round at Valencia. In 2007 he ultimately finished third overall, before regaining the title in 2008 and retaining it in 2009.

His best chance of winning a tenth title came in 2015, where he led the standings for most of the season, finishing five points behind teammate Jorge Lorenzo, the eventual champion.  was the final season he achieved over 200 points in the championship and he took his final race victory at the 2017 Dutch TT at the age of 38. After three winless seasons with the factory Yamaha team, he moved to Petronas SRT for 2021, retiring after only one season with the satellite Yamaha team and failing to achieve a podium for the first time in a career spanning 26 seasons in Grands Prix. The dominant force in MotoGP in the 2000s, all of Rossi's seven premier class titles came in this decade, including 77 race wins and 48 pole positions. In the ensuing 12 seasons, he managed 12 race wins and seven pole positions. During this period, Rossi was the 6th most successful rider in terms of total race victories.

Rossi was inducted into the MotoGP Hall of Fame as an official Legend by the FIM at the awards ceremony after the conclusion of the 2021 season. His #46 bike number was retired at the 2022 Italian Grand Prix. Rossi owns the Racing Team VR46, which competes in both Moto2 and MotoGP as of 2022. He also plans to be involved in and administering his motorcycle racing team VR46. In addition to his team management role, Rossi competes full-time in GT World Challenge Europe, driving an Audi R8 LMS for Team WRT.

Career

Early career
Rossi was born in Urbino, in the Marche region of Italy, and when a child the family moved to Tavullia. Son of former motorcycle racer Graziano Rossi, he began riding at a very young age. Rossi's first racing love, however, was karting. Fuelled by his mother, Stefania's, concern for her son's safety, Graziano purchased a kart as a substitute for the bike. However, the Rossi family trait of perpetually wanting to go faster prompted a redesign; Graziano replaced the 60 cc motor with a 100 cc national kart motor for his then 5-year-old son.

Rossi won the regional kart championship in 1990. After this, he took up minimoto and, before the end of 1991, had won numerous regional races.

Rossi continued to race karts and finished fifth at the national kart championships in Parma. Both Valentino and Graziano had started looking at moving into the Italian 100cc series, as well as the corresponding European series, which most likely would have pushed him into the direction of Formula One. However, the high cost of racing karts led to the decision to race minimoto exclusively. Through 1992 and 1993, Valentino continued to learn the ins and outs of minimoto racing.

Junior career
In 1993, Rossi was given his first opportunity to ride a 125cc motorcycle by former world champion Paolo Pileri, who became a team manager after retiring from competition. Later in 1993, with help from his father, Virginio Ferrari, Claudio Castiglioni and Cagiva factory racing team manager Claudio Lusuardi, Rossi competed in the 125 cc Italian Sport Production Championship on a Cagiva Mito alongside teammate Vittoriano Guareschi. At his first race meeting with the Cagiva team, he damaged his motorcycle in a first-corner crash no more than a hundred metres from the pit lane. He finished ninth that race weekend.

Although his first season in the Italian Sport Production Championship was varied, he achieved a pole position in the season's final race at Misano, where he would ultimately finish on the podium. By the second year, Rossi had been provided with a factory Mito by Lusuardi and won the Italian title.

In 1994, Rossi raced in the Italian 125 CC Championship with a prototype called Sandroni, using a Rotax engine. The bike was built by Guido Mancini, a former rider and mechanic who had worked, in the past, with Loris Capirossi. A documentary about Mancini, called "Mancini, the Motorcycle Wizard" (Il Mago Mancini), was released in 2016 by director Jeffrey Zani and explains the birth of the motorcycle and the relationship between Rossi and the mechanic.

In 1995, Rossi switched to Aprilia and won the Italian 125 CC Championship. He was third in the European Championship.

125cc World Championship

The 1996 championship season marks the debut of Rossi in grand prix motorcycle racing. He had some success in his first year, scoring consistent points and sometimes finishing just off the podium from his first race at Malaysia to Italy, but retired in both the French and Dutch rounds. He scored more points by finishing fifth at the German race but suffered another retirement at the British round.

At the 1996 Austrian Grand Prix, Rossi scored his first ever podium in the form of a third place after battling with Jorge Martínez. At the following race, which was the 1996 Czech Republic Grand Prix, he scored his first ever pole position on Saturday and his first ever race victory in the 125cc class on an AGV Aprilia RS125R on Sunday, after fighting with Jorge Martínez.

After his victory, Rossi continued to score points in Imola, retired twice at the Catalan and Rio rounds, but managed to score even more points at the last round in Australia. He finished his first season in ninth place with 111 points.

In his second year, the 1997 championship season, he moved from the AGV team to the official Nastro Azzurro Aprilia Team and went on to dominate the season. He immediately started with a pole and race win at the 1997 Malaysian Grand Prix but retired at the next race in Japan. In the next two races he bounced back by winning the Spanish and Italian rounds. He finished second in Austria, just 0.004 seconds behind race winner Noboru Ueda, then scored a flurry of race victories from France to Britain, including three pole positions at the Dutch, Imola and German rounds.

He scored a third place at the Czech round, and eventually picked up two more wins at the Catalan and Indonesian races. He finished in sixth place in Australia. He won the 1997 125cc title, winning 11 of the 15 races with 321 points. Throughout the 1997 season, he dressed up as Robin Hood and carried a blow-up doll on a few occasions. This fun-loving character gained him many fans throughout this and the future seasons.

250cc World Championship
After winning the title in 1997, Rossi moved up to the 250cc class the following year.

In 1998, the Aprilia RS250 was reaching its pinnacle and had a team of riders in Rossi, Loris Capirossi and Tetsuya Harada. Rossi's year started off poorly, retiring in the first two rounds; Japan and Malaysia. He came back from this by scoring three consecutive second places in Spain, Italy and France, but retired once more at the Madrid round.

He scored his first victory at the 1998 Dutch TT, winning with more than 19 seconds from second-place Jürgen Fuchs. He had to retire at the British grand prix but bounced back by scoring a podium place in Germany, finishing third.

He retired once more in the Czech Republic, crashing out of the race, but a flurry of victories from Imola to Argentina saw him end in second place in his rookie year in the class with 201 points, just 23 points behind 1998 250cc champion Loris Capirossi.

In his second year in the 250cc class, 1999, Rossi became the sole driver of the official Aprilia Grand Prix Racing team, and once again dominated the season. He started the season off with a pole position in Malaysia on Saturday but finished fifth on race day. He would pick up further points in Japan and went on to win his first race of the season at the third round in Spain.

Rossi scored his second pole position of the season in France, but suffered a retirement on Sunday. He bounced back with back-to-back wins in Italy and Catalunya and finished second at the Dutch round, narrowly losing out on the race victory with Capirossi. He won three more races from Britain to the Czech Republic, picking up yet another pole position in Germany.

Rossi finished second in Imola and off the podium in eighth place at the Valencian Community round. He finished the season strong with three more race wins: one in Australia, where he fought hard with Olivier Jacque, one in South Africa and one in Rio de Janeiro. After that, he finished in third position at the Argentinian round after scoring pole position on Saturday.

He won the title in Rio de Janeiro with one round left and finished the season in first place with 309 points, granting him his first 250cc world championship title and his second title overall.

500cc World Championship

Honda (2000–2001)

2000
After achieving the 250cc World Championship in 1999, Rossi was given a seat with Honda in what was then the highest class in World Championship motorcycle racing, the 500cc. Retired five-time 500cc World Champion Mick Doohan, who had also had Jeremy Burgess as chief engineer, worked with Rossi as his personal mentor in his first year at Honda. It was also the first time Rossi raced against Max Biaggi.

Rossi started off his first year in the 500cc class with two retirements in the first two rounds: he crashed out of the South African and Malaysian rounds. He scored points at the third round in Japan and picked up two third-place finishes in Spain and France. Rossi picked up additional points in Italy and another third-place podium finish at the Catalan round. He picked up additional points by finishing in sixth position at the 2000 Dutch TT.

It took nine races before Rossi won on the Honda, but his first 500cc victory came after a fierce battle with the Suzuki of Kenny Roberts Jr. and the Aprilia of Jeremy McWilliams. On a track that was affected by ever-changing weather conditions and despite only qualifying in seventh position on Saturday, the Italian chose the right tyres and stormed through the field to battle with Roberts Jr. and McWilliams and win his first race in the 500cc class.
After his victory in Donington Park, Rossi went on to score consecutive podium places in the next three races: two second-place finishes in Germany and the Czech Republic and one third-place finish in Portugal. He retired from the Valencian Community round after crashing out of the race.

Rossi won the Rio round. However, it was Kenny Roberts Jr. who clinched the 2000 title after finishing in sixth position, which gave him an unassailable lead in the championship. After his second 500cc win, Rossi went on to finish second at the Pacific race and third at the Australian races. He finished second in his rookie season in the 500cc class with 209 points.

2001

Rossi dominated his second season in the 500cc class, scoring 11 wins and only finishing off the podium three times. He started the year off with a victory in Japan after battling with Max Biaggi. He then achieved back-to-back poles and race wins at the South African and Spanish rounds. He finished the French race in third place but crashed out of the Italian round whilst leading the wet race after taking another pole on Saturday.

Rossi bounced back by taking pole position and winning the following race in Catalunya, despite making a poor start that dropped him to 15th place at the end of the first lap. He scored a second place after narrowly losing out on the race victory with Biaggi at the Dutch round. He followed this up with another win: this time the British GP.

Rossi finished a disappointing seventh in Germany but then took back-to-back wins in the Czech Republic (gaining a 29-point advantage over Biaggi) and Portugal. He had another disappointing result at the Valencian Community round when he finished in 11th place, but then scored a string of race wins from the Pacific to the Rio rounds.

Rossi won his first 500cc title with 325 points and third title overall, 106 points ahead of Biaggi, who became Rossi's main rival during the season. As of 2020, Rossi is the last satellite rider to clinch the title in the premier class. During the season, Rossi also teamed up with American rider Colin Edwards for the Suzuka 8 Hours endurance race aboard a Honda VTR1000SPW, becoming the first Italian rider to win the race. The pair won the race despite Rossi's lack of experience racing superbikes. In 2002, 500cc two-strokes were still allowed, but saw the beginning of the 990cc four-stroke MotoGP class, after which the 500cc machines essentially became obsolete.

MotoGP World Championship

Honda (2002–2003)

2002

The inaugural year for the MotoGP bikes was 2002, when riders experienced teething problems getting used to the new bikes.

Rossi started the year off strong and won the first race in wet conditions in Japan, beating several local riders who were racing as wildcards. He also took the pole position in the first five races.

Rossi finished second in South Africa, where his teammate Tohru Ukawa took his first and only victory in the MotoGP class. He then scored victories from the Spanish to the German rounds, including two pole positions at the Dutch and British GPs. He registered his only retirement of the season at the Czech Republic round before scoring back-to-back wins in Portugal and Rio, two second-place finishes at the Pacific and Malaysia, another victory in Australia and a second-place finish at the final race at the Valencian Community.

Rossi went on to win eight of the first nine races of the season, eventually claiming 11 victories in total. He clinched his second title at the Rio de Janeiro race, his first in the inaugural class, and fourth title overall with four races remaining.

2003

After a strong 2002, Rossi continued to dominate in 2003 even though he got some competition from emerging Spaniard Sete Gibernau. Rossi took pole and won the first round of the season in Japan, but the race was marred by the death of Japanese rider Daijiro Kato who crashed at the 130R and hit the barrier at high speed in the ensuing Casio Triangle. Rossi finished second at the South African round before winning again in Spain, despite falling back to ninth place on the opening lap.

Rossi scored three pole positions in the next three races and finished second in France after battling with Gibernau, who overtook him on the last lap. He won in Italy and came second again in Catalunya. He took two third-place finishes at the Dutch and British rounds – the latter the result of a ten-second penalty for overtaking under yellow flags, gifting victory to Max Biaggi in the process – and another second place in Germany, once again battling Gibernau who denied him victory with just 0.060 seconds separating both when they crossed the finish line after a titanic battle between the two.

After Germany, Rossi won three more races and scored two more poles: a pole position converted into a victory came at the Czech Republic where he battled with championship rival Gibernau once more, Rossi overtaking him on the final lap to take victory by just 0.042 seconds. A regular victory came in Portugal and another pole-victory came at the Rio de Janeiro rounds. He finished second at the Pacific GP after a mistake made him run off into the gravel and relegated him to ninth, which made it impossible for him to catch race winner Biaggi in the closing laps.

Rossi ended his season in style by scoring three consecutive poles and race wins at the Malaysian, Australian and Valencian Community rounds. The Australian Grand Prix at Phillip Island is considered by many observers to be one of Rossi's greatest career moments due to the unique circumstances. After being given a ten-second penalty for overtaking Marco Melandri under yellow flags due to a crash by Ducati rider Troy Bayliss, front runner Rossi pulled away from the rest of the field after being informed of the penalty, eventually finishing more than 15 seconds ahead, overcoming the penalty and winning the race.

Rossi won the 2003 title in Malaysia, his third in the top class and fifth title overall, with two races remaining. He won the final race at the Valencian Community round with a special livery, this race marking his final win for Honda.

With increased scepticism that the reason for his success was the dominance of the RC211V rather than Rossi, they parted ways at the end of the season. Mid-season rumours pointed towards a possible move to Ducati, which sent the Italian press into a frenzy; the concept of Rossi on the great Italian bike seemed too good to be true. Ducati did indeed try to seduce Rossi into riding their MotoGP bike, the Desmosedici, but for numerous reasons Rossi passed the offer up. Critics say that compared to the other manufacturers, Ducati had a significant way to go before being competitive even with Rossi at the helm. This proved to be the truth with Ducati's lacklustre performance in the 2004 season, which had actually been worse than their inaugural year in MotoGP in 2003. In his 2005 autobiography, What If I'd Never Tried It?, Rossi offered another reason for choosing Yamaha over Ducati, saying that the mindset at Ducati Corse was similar to the one he was trying to escape from at Honda. Ultimately, Rossi signed a two-year contract with rivals Yamaha reportedly worth in excess of US$12 million; a price no other manufacturer, even Honda, was willing to pay.

Yamaha (2004–2010)

2004

Rossi made the switch from Honda to Yamaha and signed a two-year contract with the team. Many doubted his move and would expect Biaggi, who joined the Honda Pons team a year earlier, as well as Gibernau to be genuine contenders for the title this year.

With the traditional first venue of the season at Suzuka having been taken off the calendar due to safety concerns following the fatal accident of Daijiro Kato in 2003, the 2004 season started at Welkom in South Africa. Rossi took the pole on Saturday and won the South African race after a hard-fought battle with Max Biaggi, becoming the first ever rider to win consecutive races with different manufacturers, having won the final race of the previous season on his Honda bike. Rossi took another pole in Spain but his fourth-place finish on Sunday saw the end of a 23-race podium streak. He once again had to miss out on the podium in France but responded with three consecutive victories in Italy, Catalunya and the Netherlands, a race that he won from pole after a hard-fought battle with Gibernau.

Arriving at the Rio de Janeiro race, Rossi crashed out when he lost the front of his M1 and slid into the gravel whilst battling with Makoto Tamada, Max Biaggi, Nicky Hayden and Alex Barros, forcing him to retire from the race in the process. After the Rio round, Rossi found himself off the podium once more in fourth place at the German GP but bounced back by winning the British round from pole. He then went on to finish second in the Czech Republic, first in Portugal and second once again in Japan.

At the inaugural Qatar round, controversy arose when Rossi's team was penalised by starting at the back of the grid for grid cleaning. Gibernau won the race, whilst Rossi crashed out of the race when he was in sixth position. Despite this second DNF of the season, Rossi scored a pole that he converted into a win in Malaysia and two more regular victories at the Australian and Valencian Community rounds, battling with the likes of Troy Bayliss, Nicky Hayden, Makoto Tamada and Max Biaggi to take his ninth victory of the year.

Rossi finished first with 304 points to Gibernau's 257, with Max Biaggi third with 217 points. He clinched his third MotoGP, fourth top class and sixth overall championship at the penultimate race of the season at Phillip Island, beating Gibernau by just 0.097 seconds to do so.

2005

In 2005, Rossi and the Factory Yamaha team proved to be even more dominant than the year before. Rossi immediately began the season by capturing pole and winning the first round in Spain in a controversial manner, colliding with the Gresini Honda of Sete Gibernau on the last lap. He scored a second-place finish in Portugal but then went on to take five consecutive victories from the Chinese to the Dutch rounds, including three pole positions in France, Italy and Assen.

At the first United States round since 1994, Rossi struggled and finish in third place whilst local hero Nicky Hayden won the race. Rossi bounced back by picking up three more wins, starting from a pole-victory in a rainy Great Britain and two regular victories in Germany, holding off Gibernau on the last lap, and the Czech Republic.

Rossi's first and only non-podium and retirement of the season came at the Japanese round, when he collided with Marco Melandri during a failed overtaking attempt. After Motegi, Rossi scored a podium in the form of second place in Malaysia and back-to-back wins in Qatar and Australia, beating Nicky Hayden for the victory. He finished the season with a second and third-place finish at the inaugural Turkish and the Valencian Community rounds.

Rossi finished the season in first place with a total of 367 points, 147 points ahead of second-place finisher Marco Melandri and captured his fourth MotoGP, fifth top class and seventh overall championship in Sepang with four races remaining. He won 11 races including wins in three rain-affected races at Shanghai, Le Mans and Donington.

2006

The 2006 season started off with Rossi once again being the favourite to win the title. However, at the first round in Spain, Rossi was unlucky when Toni Elías misjudged his braking point into a corner and hit the rear wheel of the Italian, who crashed into the gravel as a result. He rejoined the race but only managed to finish 14th. In the next race in Qatar, he scored his first win of the season but finished just off the podium in the next round in Turkey.

Going into the third round in China, disaster would strike again when Rossi was forced to retire after he moved up from thirteenth to fifth and was battling with Colin Edwards and John Hopkins for third position. A chunk of rubber from his front tyre had been thrown on his front fender, knocking it off the motorbike. Things didn't improve for him at the next round in France, he brushed the back of Honda rider Dani Pedrosa, causing him to run wide and hit Randy de Puniet who then fell from his Kawasaki after striking Sete Gibernau. After climbing his way back up to second, Rossi overtook Hopkins on the fifth lap and started to pull a gap from Pedrosa after Hopkins lost the front of his Suzuki at an off-camber right-hander on lap 10 and retired. He was leading comfortably in first place with a gap of over three seconds until his Yamaha had a mechanical problem on lap 21, forcing Rossi to retire for the second consecutive race. Rossi would leave Le Mans eighth in the standings with a 43-points deficit to Nicky Hayden.

After these two disappointing races, Rossi bounced back by scoring two wins: a regular victory in Italy and a pole-victory in Catalunya. At the Dutch round, he only finished eighth after he fractured his hand and ankle when he fell on Thursday. The race was won by Nicky Hayden, who battled with Yamaha teammate Colin Edwards on the last lap. Edwards tried to lunge past Hayden, but ran wide onto the gravel and eventually fell at the last corner.

With the disappointing result at Assen, Rossi took second place in Great Britain and another win in Germany, fighting tooth and nail with the three Honda's of Marco Melandri, Nicky Hayden and Dani Pedrosa. However, he retired once more in the United States round due to mechanical problems at the last few laps whilst local hero Nicky Hayden won the event for a second consecutive time. This extended Hayden's lead over Rossi by 34 points to 51 and saw Rossi drop to fourth in the championship.

Going into round 12 in the Czech Republic, Rossi picked up a pole and a second place, and then won the next round in Malaysia. Hayden held the points lead throughout most of the season, but by now Rossi was slowly working his way up the points ladder. A third place in Australia and a further second position in Japan saw the points lead of Hayden reduced from 51 points at Laguna Seca to 12 points in Motegi, with Rossi moving from fourth to second in the championship standings.

Going into the penultimate round of the season in Portugal, Rossi took pole position on Saturday. On Sunday, Hayden was taken out by his teammate Dani Pedrosa on lap 5, causing both riders to retire. On the last lap, Toni Elías who was in third place, overtook both Kenny Roberts Jr. and Rossi to take the lead. Rossi eventually got back in front, but Elías shot past him at the final corner and won the race with a minuscule 0.002 second advantage over Rossi. This led to Rossi taking the points lead by 8 points going into the last round of the year.

At the final race of the season, the Valencian Community round, Rossi needed to finish in second place or higher to win the title. He took the second consecutive pole position on Saturday whilst Hayden could only qualify fifth. However, Rossi got a poor start on Sunday when the red lights went out, dropping him back in seventh place. On lap five, he made a mistake, lost the front wheel of his M1 and slid out of contention. He managed to get going again, but it would be to no avail: Rossi only managed to finish 13th, finishing the season on 247 points and losing the title to Nicky Hayden by just five points. The race was won by wildcard rider Troy Bayliss, who replaced the injured Sete Gibernau. After the race, Rossi called his fall "a disaster" but congratulated Nicky on his won title as well.

2007

After Rossi lost the title in 2006, he nonetheless tried again in 2007 as he was still one of the favourites to win the championship. The bike power was reduced from 990cc to 800cc for this season and over the winter, Yamaha worked on a new bike fitting these specifications for both Rossi and Colin Edwards. In the season opener in Qatar, Rossi took his first pole position of the year on Saturday but came second to Casey Stoner on the Ducati on Sunday, who had made the switch from the LCR Honda team to the Factory Ducati team. Rossi then won the second race in Spain to bounce back. In Turkey, Rossi clinched another pole on Saturday but eventually finished way down in tenth position after running wide on the fast turn eleven when he pushed hard to break away on the opening lap. Rossi fought his way back to second, overtaking Loris Capirossi on lap nine, but lost positions quickly after the Michelin tyres started to fade and he suffered from a mysterious lack of speed, which allowed Toni Elías, Capirossi, John Hopkins, Marco Melandri and Alex Barros to overtake him within three laps. Stoner led every lap, won the race and gained a 10-point lead over Rossi in the process.

Rossi, once again finding himself on the backfoot in the championship, responded in China by setting another pole position on Saturday and finishing in second place after battling hard with Stoner. The Australian, who made good use of the straight line speed of the Ducati on the long straight, blasted past Rossi every time he got overtaken earlier on the circuit. At the French round, Chris Vermeulen on the Suzuki won a rain-affected race. Rossi initially started well and even overtook Stoner in the early part of the race to make a break but when the rain intensified, Rossi and his YZR-M1 struggled and were overtaken by Stoner, Randy de Puniet, Sylvain Guintoli and later also Nicky Hayden, Dani Pedrosa and Alex Hofmann. Rossi eventually finished in sixth whilst Stoner crossed the line in third, extending his championship lead by 21 points.

In Italy, he won his first race of the season and at round seven in Catalunya, Rossi took his fourth and final pole of the season. After a hard-fought battle with Stoner, Rossi finished second by just 0.069 seconds and lost out again. In Great Britain, Rossi finished just outside of the podium in fourth but bounced back at the Dutch round in great fashion by winning the race from eleventh on the grid. He overtook many riders and eventually did the same to Stoner with four laps to go, building up a small gap he never gave away when crossing the line.

After Rossi's great win in Assen, bad luck struck him when he crashed on lap five of the German round and was forced to retire. He had made a poor start, dropping him from sixth to ninth on lap one, but was quick to regain two positions before struggling to pass Randy de Puniet for sixth position. When Rossi tried to squeeze his bike next to the Kawasaki of de Puniet, he lost the front of his M1 at low speed through a long right-hander and slid into the gravel. Rossi then picked up more points by finishing in fourth and seventh place at the United States and Czech Republic, but by then Stoner had built up a 60-point gap over Rossi when they left round 12.

Rossi retired once again at the new San Marino venue whilst Stoner took his eighth win of the season, extending his championship lead from 60 to 85 points. At the next round in Portugal, Rossi would win his final race of the season after a close fight with the Honda of Dani Pedrosa. Rossi worked his way up from fifth to third on the opening lap, overtaking Stoner on lap nine after Pedrosa did the same two laps earlier. He then overtook Pedrosa on lap ten and a fight commenced where Pedrosa re-overtook Rossi on lap 16, only taking the first spot back from the Spaniard with four laps left after he ran wide. Rossi made a similar error and Pedrosa retook the lead just half a lap later. Pedrosa was still narrowly ahead but Rossi was better on the brakes and plunged down the inside of the first corner in turn one. The move failed and he ran wide, but carried enough momentum to try the same move again a few corners later, this time succeeding. Rossi crossed the line 0.175 seconds ahead of Pedrosa to win his fourth race of the season.

At the Japanese round, Rossi suffered from braking problems on his second bike after all riders were forced to swap bikes due to the drying track, finishing in 13th position. This was enough for Casey Stoner to become 2007 world champion after he finished the race in sixth position and gave him an unassailable lead in the championship. Rossi went on to take one last podium in Australia, finishing in third place, then picked up points in fifth position at the Malaysian round. At the last race of the season, the Valencian Community race, Rossi started way back in 17th due to a fracture of three bones in his right hand after he fell during qualifying. He took 16th on lap seven and passed Shinya Nakano for 15th and thus the final point, but was forced to retire on lap 18 after his YZR-M1 suffered a technical problem, this marking his third DNF of the season. The race was won by Dani Pedrosa, with Casey Stoner about five seconds behind in second place.

Stoner dominated the season, winning ten races to take his first title, 125 points clear of second place Dani Pedrosa. Rossi on the other hand, finished in third place with 241 points, six less than in 2006. This was Rossi's lowest championship position since his first season in 1996 in the 125cc. Pedrosa's win in the last race at Valencia combined with Rossi's retirement meant that he beat Rossi by a single point.

2008

After two frustrating seasons where Rossi and Yamaha lost the title for two consecutive seasons to Nicky Hayden's Honda and Casey Stoner's Ducati, critics started to doubt if he was capable of ever winning another title. Few people thought Some said he should retire, whilst others assumed that Casey Stoner would win his second title or that Dani Pedrosa would become a genuine title contender after his strong performances in 2006 and 2007. This was also the year he switched from Michelin to Bridgestone tyres, which Rossi claimed was needed to "boost his motivation". His new teammate, Jorge Lorenzo, did not opt for the change.

Rossi started the year with a fifth place in Qatar whilst Stoner won the race, prompting some to already suggest that it would be more of the same like last year. However, Rossi fought back in Spain by finishing second whilst Stoner could only manage eleventh place. Rossi finished third at the Portuguese round with his teammate Jorge Lorenzo winning after a late charge from Pedrosa was not enough to retake the lead.

After the good performances in Spain and Portugal, Rossi scored three consecutive victories: two regular victories at China and France and a pole-victory at the Italian round. Two more second-place finishes followed, one in Catalunya and one in Great Britain.

Approaching round 9 of the season, the Dutch GP was not a success for Rossi. He came to Assen with an 11-point lead over runner-up Pedrosa but made a slow start from third on the grid, only to lose the back of his M1 machine on the entry of a tight left hand hairpin – his rear wheel sliding around and collecting Randy de Puniet's LCR Honda, taking him out in the process. Rossi remounted the bike and got going again but could only finish eleventh, handing the lead of the championship to Pedrosa by four points.

After the disappointing result in Assen, Rossi retook the lead of the title hunt in a rain-affected German round after Pedrosa crashed out of the wet track and Rossi came second, the race was won by Stoner. Rossi then took a multitude of race wins from the United States, where Rossi took the win after a hard battle and a pass down the "Corkscrew" corner over Stoner, who crashed a few laps later but continued and took second place, to Japan, including a pole-victory at a rain-shortened race in Indianapolis. His wins in both Laguna Seca and Indianapolis also meant that Rossi had won at every circuit on the calendar at the time and his win at Motegi was his first MotoGP victory at the track, becoming the first Yamaha rider to win at the Honda-owned circuit.

Going into round 15 of the championship, Rossi needed to finish third or higher to win the title at Motegi. He started off poor, dropping from fourth to fifth on the grid but quickly made up ground by overtaking Jorge Lorenzo and Nicky Hayden on lap two before he hunted down his title rivals. When Stoner made the pass on Pedrosa on lap six, Rossi did the same and went after Stoner until he made the race winning move on lap 14 under braking. Rossi then pulled away from the Ducati rider to cross the line in first position and clinch his fifth MotoGP, sixth top class and eighth overall championship in Japan with three races remaining. On the podium, he wore a shirt with the text "Scusate il ritardo" ("Sorry for the delay") in Italian, emphasising his lack of titles in the last two years.

After Rossi wrapped up the title in Motegi with an unassailable lead of 92 points, he scored three more podiums: a second-place finish behind home hero Stoner in Australia, another win in Malaysia and a third place at the Valencian Community round.

Rossi finished first in the championship with 373 points, 93 points ahead of second place Casey Stoner.

2009

After the unexpected success and title of Rossi in 2008, many expected him to be a strong contender in 2009. Rossi took two consecutive second places: a regular podium in Qatar and a pole-podium in Japan, the race won by Rossi's teammate Jorge Lorenzo.

Rossi's first victory of the year came at the third round in Spain. Rossi started fourth, but overtook teammate Lorenzo for third on lap two, then made a second pass stick for second position on lap seven. Race leader Pedrosa was ahead with 1.4 seconds ahead of him by then, but Rossi stormed to the rear wheel of the Honda rider with eleven laps to go. He made the victory pass at the Nieto corner to take a lead of 2.7 seconds when crossing the line, taking the championship lead over from Stoner by eleven points in the process.

The French GP turned out to be a disaster for Rossi. Jorge Lorenzo won the frantic wet/dry race whilst Rossi fell after a premature bike swap to slick tyres and also received a ride through penalty, ending up in sixteenth place and thus failed to score any points. This handed the championship lead to Rossi's teammate Lorenzo who now is ahead of both Rossi and Stoner by just one point.

Things started to look better when Rossi registered a third position finish in Italy, but lost his sequence of seven consecutive victories at the venue. After Mugello, Rossi took two more victories: a regular victory at Catalunya, battling with Lorenzo throughout the race and overtaking him on the last corner of the last lap to win the race by just 0.095 seconds and a pole-victory at the Dutch round. This victory marked his 100th career win, becoming only the second rider in motorcycle grand prix history – after Giacomo Agostini – to reach 100 wins.

At the United States GP, Rossi finished a close second behind surprise race winner Dani Pedrosa. He then went on to score three more pole positions: a pole-win at the German round, fighting tooth and nail once more with his teammate Jorge Lorenzo with five laps to go. On the penultimate lap, Rossi retook the lead and held off the Spaniard to claim win by a margin of 0.099 seconds. This win gave Rossi a championship lead of 14 points over Lorenzo and a 28-point lead over Stoner. At the next race in Great Britain, Rossi started from pole but was demoted to third on the first lap. A five-strong lead group of Jorge Lorenzo, Andrea Dovizioso, Rossi, Dani Pedrosa and Toni Elías were battling for the lead when Elías was the first to fall on lap eight after he clipped a wet white line on the track, a similar mistake also lead to Lorenzo's fall and retirement. This left Dovizioso and Rossi to battle it out, but as the rain intensified, so did their lead. Both were ahead with 13 seconds, separating them and third place Randy de Puniet. However, it was not meant to be as Rossi spun out of the lead when the rear of his M1 span-out through the Fogarty Esses on lap 20, demoting him to eleventh and leaving Dovizioso almost ten seconds clear of de Puniet. Rossi climbed up to fifth on the last lap, overtaking home hero James Toseland at the final turn, but the race victory went to the Honda of Andrea Dovizioso for the first time. At the Czech Republic round, Rossi took a commanding victory, crossing the line more than 11 seconds ahead of second place Pedrosa.

Rossi's first and only retirement came at Indianapolis when he crashed out of the race after being overtaken by the eventual winner Lorenzo on lap ten. This win meant that Lorenzo had halved Rossi's title advantage to just 25 points with five rounds to go. At the next race in San Marino, Rossi responded by taking his sixth pole position of the year on Saturday and winning the race at his "home venue" ahead of Lorenzo on Sunday, extending his lead to 30 points. In Portugal however, it was Lorenzo who had the upper hand, winning the race with Rossi only able to finish fourth, reducing the championship lead from 30 to 18 points. At the Australian round, Rossi finished a close second to home hero Casey Stoner who won the race. Lorenzo crashed on the opening lap after running into Nicky Hayden's Honda, forcing him to retire. This widened the championship gap from 18 to 38 points with two rounds remaining.

At the penultimate round in Malaysia, Rossi scored another pole position on Saturday and a podium in the form of third place at the wet track in Sepang on race day, behind Stoner and Pedrosa. This was enough for him to clinch his sixth MotoGP, seventh top class and ninth overall title over Jorge Lorenzo who started at the back of the grid and only managed to finish fourth, behind Rossi. This gave him an unassailable lead of 45 points over Lorenzo. The final race of the season, the Valencian Community, resulted in a final second place podium of the year for Rossi, behind Pedrosa.

Rossi finished first in the championship with 306 points, 72 points ahead of second-place Jorge Lorenzo. Six wins was the lowest number of wins Rossi has had in a championship winning season; the previous minima were nine in 1999 in the 250cc class and 2003, 2004 and 2008 in MotoGP. Rossi also failed to win at Mugello for the first time since 2001.

On 8 June 2009, Rossi rode a Yamaha around the famous Snaefell Mountain Course in an exhibition lap at the 2009 Isle of Man TT alongside Agostini, in what was called 'The Lap of the Gods'. This had been delayed by 48 hours due to bad weather. He also performed the garlanding ceremony for the Superbike podium, bestowing the podium of John McGuinness, Steve Plater and Guy Martin.

2010

With two consecutive titles won, Rossi was once again the favourite to win the championship going into the 2010 season and this seemed even more likely after he topped all but one of the pre-season testing sessions over the winter.

Rossi started off the first few races well. He won the first race of the season in Qatar after early leader Casey Stoner crashed out, took third place in Spain even though he had an injured shoulder sustained from a motocross accident two weeks earlier – the race being won by his teammate Jorge Lorenzo after a last-lap pass at the Dry Sack corner on Honda's Dani Pedrosa – and a pole-podium in the form of a second place in France where Lorenzo claimed back-to-back wins for the first time in his MotoGP career. The injury Rossi had was not taken seriously initially and was expected to cure in a few weeks, but that did not turn out as expected and the ligament tear in his shoulder failed to heal sufficiently.

At round four in Italy, things took a turn for the worse for Rossi. He suffered a displaced compound fracture of his right tibia. This crushed any hopes of him winning the 2010 title, and after post-surgical care close to his home in the hospital at Cattolica, it was clear that he was out of contention for the next two or three months. It was the first time that Rossi had missed a race in his Grand Prix career, and allowed his title rivals – Lorenzo, Pedrosa and Stoner – to gain points, podiums and wins while he was absent for the Italian, British, Dutch and Catalan rounds.

Ahead of the British Grand Prix, Suzi Perry reported in her Daily Telegraph column that Rossi was planning on making a comeback at Brno. This was confirmed a week later by Rossi himself. On 7 July, Rossi rode at Misano on a Superbike World Championship-specification Yamaha YZF-R1 provided by the Yamaha World Superbike Team to test his leg's recovery. He completed 26 laps during two runs, with a best lap time that was around two seconds off the pace of recent World Superbike times at the circuit. At the conclusion of the session, Rossi complained of discomfort, reporting pain in both his leg and his shoulder. On 12 July, Rossi took part in another test at Brno, after which Rossi stated he was happier and a lot more in form.

After an observation by the Chief Medical Officer on the Thursday before the German GP weekend and missing four rounds, Rossi returned in Germany and remarkably finished just off the podium in fourth position after losing out to Casey Stoner on the final corner, starting fifth. He returned two rounds earlier than predicted, and only 41 days after his accident. At round 9 of the season, held in the United States, Rossi took his first podium since his broken leg seven weeks ago at Mugello, overtaking the Honda of Andrea Dovizioso in the process. The race was won by Lorenzo after Pedrosa crashed out of the lead. At the next two rounds, in the Czech Republic and Indianapolis, Rossi scored lackluster results by finishing fifth and fourth.

At his "home race" in San Marino, Rossi scored another third place behind race-winner Pedrosa and second-place Lorenzo. The race was marred by the death of the Japanese Moto2 rider Shoya Tomizawa, who was hit at high speed by Alex de Angelis and Scott Redding after he fell at the fast right-hander of the Misano circuit on lap 12 and succumbed to his injuries later in the hospital. At the new venue in Aragón, Rossi was again off the pace and finished in sixth position. He bounced back by scoring another third-place podium in Japan, the race being moved from April to October due to the disruption of air travel after the second eruption of the Eyjafjallajökull volcano in Iceland. Rossi battled with teammate Lorenzo for the bottom step of the podium during the race, which was won by Casey Stoner, but by now had a 69-point lead in the championship over second place Dani Pedrosa.

In Malaysia, Rossi took a stunning victory by winning the race from eleventh position, battling with the Honda of Dovizioso for the win multiple times. Rossi had qualified sixth, but lost multiple positions in the first set of corners after a poor getaway. He overtook multiple riders, including Lorenzo, to fight for the lead with Dovizioso on a few occasions, but held on to finish ahead of him with just 0.224 seconds. This was his first win since the accident in June, and his second win of the season. However, Lorenzo won the title, finishing in third place when he needed ninth or higher to win the title.

After his win in Malaysia, Rossi continued to impress by scoring a third place in Australia, a second place in Portugal and a final third place at the Valencian Community rounds.

Rossi finished third in the championship with 233 points, 150 points behind champion Jorge Lorenzo and 12 points behind runner-up Dani Pedrosa. Rossi collected ten podiums throughout the season, including five consecutive podiums in the season's final run.

Ducati (2011–2012)

2011

On 15 August 2010, after the Brno race, Rossi confirmed he was going to ride for the Ducati team, signing a two-year deal starting in 2011 and joining former Honda racing teammate Nicky Hayden. He tested the Desmosedici for the first time in Valencia on 9 November 2010, making this his first appearance since 1999 on an Italian motorcycle. Rossi underwent surgery on his shoulder which he injured during the 2010 season in order to be ready for pre-season testing in Malaysia. After initial progress during the first test, the Ducati failed to meet the team's expectations at the second Malaysian test and left Rossi unsatisfied, having finished over 1.8 seconds behind Casey Stoner's pace-setting Honda.

There was much anticipation for the first race of the season; Rossi on an Italian bike turned quite some heads, but he started the season on a disappointing note, only finishing seventh in Qatar. At the second round in Spain, he had moved up from twelfth on the grid to third when he collided with the Honda of Casey Stoner with 20 laps to go. As Rossi edged past on the inside of Stoner, his bike slipped from under him in the wet conditions, causing both riders to slide off the track. Rossi resumed and eventually finished fifth but Stoner retired from the race. Rossi later apologised for the incident. Another fifth place followed in Portugal where he rose from ninth to fourth, battling with the Honda of Andrea Dovizioso who snatched fourth place from him at the line.

Rossi's best result of the year came in France, where he took his first and only podium of the season. He battled hard with the Yamaha of Jorge Lorenzo and the Honda of Andrea Dovizioso, overtaking both for fifth place, when Dani Pedrosa and Marco Simoncelli at the front collided. Pedrosa crashed and retired from the race whilst Simoncelli was given a ride-through penalty.

Rossi then finished the next four races inside the top six; fifth at Catalunya, sixth in Great Britain, fourth at the Dutch round and sixth again in Italy.

At round nine in Germany, Rossi disappointingly finished in ninth place. At the next two races in the United States and the Czech Republic, he picked up two sixth places but once again scored a disappointing result when he crossed the line in tenth at Indianapolis after he encountered gearbox problems in the race. On lap nine, Rossi ran last and considered retiring, but climbed his way back up to tenth place in the end.

Poor results continued at his "home grand prix" in San Marino and Aragón when Rossi only managed to finish seventh and tenth, battling with the Tech 3 Yamaha of Cal Crutchlow before he got the better of Rossi to cross the line 0.180 seconds ahead of him.

Rossi ended the year on a low. At the Japanese round, he crashed out of the race on the first lap after a couple of corners. He collided with Jorge Lorenzo and Ben Spies and left Rossi with a blow to his finger. Another retirement followed in Australia when Rossi tried to overtake Álvaro Bautista for fifth on lap 14, lost the front of his Ducati and slid out of the race.

In Malaysia, Rossi qualified ninth but was involved in a collision with Marco Simoncelli and Colin Edwards on the second lap of the race. Simoncelli fell while running fourth, landing in the path of Edwards and Rossi who both hit his Honda. Simoncelli's helmet also came off in the incident. The blow resulted in the Italian suffering critical injuries, where he later died in hospital. At the Valencian Community race, Rossi retired at the first corner after Álvaro Bautista fell from his bike and took down Rossi, teammate Hayden and Randy de Puniet in the process.

Rossi finished seventh in the championship with 139 points, 211 points behind champion Casey Stoner. He also finished a season winless for the first time in his Grand Prix career.

2012

After a frustrating first season with the Ducati, 2012 was a little better for Rossi. He started poorly in Qatar, starting from twelfth and only mustered tenth at the line. In Spain and Portugal, he finished in ninth and seventh positions, respectively.

One of his best results of the year came at the French round. He started from seventh on the grid but moved to fourth on the opening lap and overtook the fading Pedrosa for third on lap three. Rossi then was caught by the Tech 3 Yamaha's of Cal Crutchlow and Andrea Dovizioso who battled with him over the bottom step of the podium from laps 4 to 18 until Crutchlow lost the front end of his M1 at the first corner. He remounted and continued the race as did Dovizioso, who suffered the same fate with four laps to go. After breaking free of both the Tech 3 riders, Rossi slashed the advantage Stoner had built up during the fighting and reeled him in over the remaining ten laps. On the penultimate lap, Rossi tried to overtake Stoner on the fast left-right combination at the beginning of the track but ran wide and Stoner retook the position. On the final lap, Rossi retried the move, this time successfully, and built a small gap over the remainder of the lap to cross the line in second place: the best finish Rossi has on a Ducati to date.

Over the next couple of races, the Ducati continued to perform poorly, allowing Rossi to score points only. He finished seventh in Catalunya while in Great Britain, Rossi was fastest in the first free-practice session but finished the race in ninth. After a thirteenth-place finish at the Dutch round Rossi finished sixth in Germany, his best dry result of the season so far. In Italy, he improved upon his German result and finished fifth. His first and only DNF of the season came at the United States GP. Rossi was going to come home in eighth position when he fell at the corkscrew corner whilst trying to brake. He was also unhappy with the bike setup for the race, preventing him from riding quick enough all weekend. Rossi finished seventh at the Indianapolis and Czech Republic rounds.

Rossi equalled his best Ducati result in Le Mans by finishing second for the second consecutive time this season in San Marino. His Ducati bike got a new frame and swingarm, which improved the performance of the motorcycle. Rossi ended his final year with Ducati with lackluster performances. In Aragón he finished eighth, in Japan seventh, at the Malaysian round fifth, in Australia seventh again and at the Valencian Community round tenth.

Rossi finished sixth in the championship with 163 points, 187 points behind champion Jorge Lorenzo.

Return to Yamaha (2013–2020)

2013

On 10 August, it was confirmed that Rossi was going to leave the factory Ducati team at the end of the 2012 season. Later that day, it was also announced that Rossi were to rejoin the Yamaha factory team until the end of the 2014 season, resuming his partnership with Jorge Lorenzo. Rossi was reacquainted with the Yamaha when he tested the bike over 13–14 November 2012 at a post-season test at Valencia. However, rain prevented him from posting an accurate lap time until he tested the 2013 machine later on 5–7 February 2013 in Sepang, where he posted the third-fastest time of 2:00.542 out of 28 riders. He clocked 0.442 seconds off from pace-setter Dani Pedrosa and just 0.113 seconds off teammate Jorge Lorenzo.

He kicked off the season well. At the opening round in Qatar he had a competitive pace all weekend but lost out badly with the new qualifying format, demoting him to seventh place on race day. He quickly fought himself back to fourth on the opening lap, but ran wide when he tried to overtake Ducati replacement rider Andrea Dovizioso, once again dropping him back to seventh place. His podium chances continued to worsen when he got stuck behind Stefan Bradl but once he passed him, he defied the odds by bridging a three-second gap to Cal Crutchlow, Dani Pedrosa and rookie Marc Márquez who were fighting for second place. Rossi passed both Crutchlow and Pedrosa, but Márquez' aggressive riding style and determination led to a battle between the two. Márquez overtook Rossi on the penultimate lap, with Rossi repassing him on the final lap to stay in front and cross the line ahead of the Spanish rookie with 0.211 seconds. At the next two races at the Americas and Spain, Rossi finished in sixth and fourth position. At the French round, he finished a disappointing twelfth. He started the race from eighth on the grid and moved up to third to grab another podium but lost the position to Cal Crutchlow and then slid out of contention with ten laps to go. Rossi continued to finish in twelfth position, albeit on a damaged bike and hampered by a misting visor.

At round five in Italy, Rossi registered his only retirement of the year. He was involved with a first-lap collision with the Gresini Honda of Álvaro Bautista at the left-right chicane that forms turns two and three. Rossi rode around the outside of Bautista, but he failed to notice Rossi and clipped his bike on the approach to the right-hander, making him fall and collecting Rossi in the process. In Catalunya, Rossi finished just off the podium for the second consecutive time by finishing fourth after starting from seventh on the grid.

On 29 June 2013 at the Dutch round, Rossi recorded his first MotoGP win since Malaysia in 2010 – a 46-race winless streak. He started from fourth on the grid but overtook the Honda of Dani Pedrosa for the lead on lap six, a lead he held to the line despite a late charge by the other Honda of Márquez, who crossed the line 2.170 seconds behind the Italian. After his first win of the season in Assen, Rossi continued to score good results by scoring two more podiums in the form of third places at the German and United States, in which Márquez overtook Rossi at the corkscrew corner in similar fashion to what Rossi did to Casey Stoner in 2008 to win the race.

From Indianapolis to San Marino, Rossi scored four consecutive fourth places before scoring yet another third-place podium at Aragón after a three-way battle for the spot with Álvaro Bautista, Stefan Bradl and Cal Crutchlow. Rossi again finished just off the podium at the Malaysian round, finishing fourth but scored a final podium in the form of third place at the Australian round, once more battling Crutchlow and Bautista. At the last two rounds in Japan and at the Valencian Community, he finished sixth and fourth respectively.

Rossi finished fourth in the championship with 237 points – his best result since 2010 – 97 points behind champion Marc Márquez. He scored six podiums, including one win at Assen.

2014

At the end of the 2013 season, Rossi announced the conclusion of his long collaboration with crew chief Jeremy Burgess, who was replaced by Silvano Galbusera, the former crew chief of Marco Melandri in the Superbike World Championship.

Rossi's first year since his return to Yamaha went well, and hopes for 2014 were even higher: more podiums, wins or even the illustrious tenth title all were mentioned by people. He started the season well with a second-place finish in Qatar, storming from tenth on the grid to battle with the Honda of Márquez for the win, only to miss out on the victory on the last lap with 0.259 seconds at the line. At the next two races, the 2014 Motorcycle Grand Prix of the Americas and the new venue in Argentina, Rossi only scored points by finishing in eighth and fourth.

A better result was achieved in the fourth round of the championship in Spain, where he chose to use an extra-hard rear tyre that allowed him to move up to second from fourth on the grid and overtake Márquez at the end of the back straight on the first lap. Both swapped places over the remainder of the first and second laps, but Márquez pulled away at the Dry Sack corner and Rossi had to settle for second place. Another second place came in France after Rossi ran wide halfway through the race, allowing Márquez to win. On 1 June 2014, Rossi appeared in his 300th Grand Prix race at the Italian round, where he finished in third. His fourth second place came at the Catalan GP, leading for much of the race but ultimately losing first place to Márquez at a late stage of the race. Lackluster performances followed at the Dutch and German rounds – fifth and fourth – until a string of third places followed at the Indianapolis, Czech and British races.

At his "home race" in San Marino, Rossi won his first race since the 2013 Dutch TT round. He started third on the grid before moving up and battling with Márquez for the lead. On lap 10, Márquez fell, which allowed Rossi to pull a gap and finish first at the line, ahead of teammate Jorge Lorenzo. The victory pushed him past 5000 total career points, making him the first, and so far only, rider to achieve this.

At round 14 in Aragón, Rossi qualified in sixth place and had been making progress up the order when he ran wide onto the grass – damp due to the wet conditions – and crashed heavily. He lost consciousness briefly after the crash (or as Rossi put it: "I had a little nap") and was transferred to a hospital in Alcañiz for a precautionary CT scan.

In Australia Rossi took his second victory of the year. He benefitted from an accident of Marc Márquez who had been leading the race. It was Rossi's sixth win at the circuit after five consecutive wins he took from 2001 to 2005. In Malaysia, another second-place finish followed when he initially took the lead halfway in the race after passing Lorenzo. Márquez passed both Lorenzo and Rossi, pulling a gap and finishing 2.445 seconds ahead of the Italian. Rossi took his first pole position since the 2010 French Grand Prix at the Valencian Community race, his 60th pole position in Grand Prix racing. He finished in second place behind Márquez in the race.

Rossi finished second in the championship with 295 points, 67 points behind champion Marc Márquez.

2015

With a season of consistent podium finishes – including two wins in San Marino and Australia – there were once more hopes that Rossi might be able to win his tenth title this year. He started the 2015 season – his 20th at World Championship level – by taking victory in the opening race in Qatar; it was his first win in a season-opening race since the 2010 Qatar race. Rossi held off Ducati's Andrea Dovizioso to cross the line 0.174 seconds ahead and complete his 109th Grand Prix victory while Dovizioso's teammate Andrea Iannone finished third, completing an all-Italian podium – the first since the 2006 Japanese Grand Prix. At the second race at the Americas, Rossi scored his first third-place podium. He moved up into second place but couldn't match the pace of polesitter and eventual winner Marc Márquez and lost second position to Dovizioso in the late stages of the race. His second victory of the season came in Argentina where Rossi and polesitter Márquez had a clash after a battle for the lead, causing Márquez to crash out of the penultimate lap and handing Rossi the race victory. This win consolidated his championship lead, becoming the first rider to win a race using an extra-hard Bridgestone rear tyre.

He recorded his fourth podium finish of the year, eighth successive podium finish – and the 200th of his Grand Prix career – with a third place in Spain, then kept the run going with a second place in France and a third place on home soil in Italy. In Catalunya, Rossi finished second after a late charge on teammate and race winner Jorge Lorenzo to maintain the championship lead over his teammate by one point.

Rossi took his first pole position of the season at the Dutch race – his first pole since the 2014 Valencian Community round and 61st pole position in Grand Prix racing – and achieved his third victory of the season after a race-long battle with Márquez where the pair once again collided on the final corner on the last lap. It was his first win from pole position since the 2009 San Marino Grand Prix and his twelfth successive podium. He also extended his championship lead to ten points over Lorenzo, who finished third.

Rossi further extended his championship lead in Germany with third and continued his podium streak with third-place finishes at Indianapolis and the Czech Republic. Lorenzo's win in Brno gave him the championship lead over Rossi, by virtue of more wins at that point.

Rossi regained the championship lead with his fourth victory of the year in Great Britain after Márquez – who had been chasing him for the majority of the race – crashed out in wet conditions on lap 13 while Lorenzo finished fourth. The podium streak of 16 races ended with a fifth-place finish in San Marino, but Rossi extended his championship lead to 23 points after Lorenzo crashed out. Lorenzo won the Aragón round with Rossi finishing in third to cut the gap to fourteen points with four races remaining. The pair's results were enough for the team to clinch their respective title, their first since 2010.

In Japan, Rossi extended his championship lead to eighteen points with a second-place finish to Dani Pedrosa – his first win of the season – in drying conditions. Lorenzo had started on pole but faded to third with tyre issues. Lorenzo then cut the lead to eleven points in Australia by finishing second to Rossi's fourth.

Lorenzo further cut the lead to seven points after a second-place finish in Malaysia; Rossi finished third after a controversial collision with Márquez, in which he accrued three penalty points – enough to enforce a start from the back of the grid for the final race at the Valencian Community. Rossi accused Márquez of deliberately trying to harm his championship, something Márquez repeatedly denied. Rossi made it up to fourth in the race but with Lorenzo winning it, he took the championship by only five points.

The controversial rivalries between Rossi and Márquez appeared to end at the 2016 Catalan Grand Prix, when Rossi and Márquez shook hands at the parc ferme. However, during the 2018 Argentine Grand Prix, controversies reared up again following some disputed maneuvers carried out by Marc Márquez before and during the race, where he tried a very risky overtake on Rossi that resulted in a crash for the latter.

2016

Before the 2016 season even began, Rossi announced that he will continue his career by keeping his contract with the Factory Yamaha team until 2018. Yamaha announced that Rossi will ride a 2016 YZR-M1 which also includes ECU Michelin tyres new to MotoGP and all riders. Expecting a difficult start to the season due to the new tyres, Rossi was able to adjust as he stated to the media at Sepang during the tests.

Rossi began the 2016 season with fourth place in Qatar, albeit just two seconds from victory. In the next race in Argentina, Rossi returned to the podium with a second place behind Marc Márquez after a collision between Ducati riders Andrea Iannone and Andrea Dovizioso on the last lap allowed Rossi and Dani Pedrosa to move up, for which Iannone was penalised. The race was split into two parts similar to the 2013 Australian Grand Prix after concerns over Michelin rear tyres forced riders to make a pitstop to change bikes. Rossi had fought with Márquez for the lead in the first half of the race but fell back to fourth on his second bike before the last lap incident between the Ducatis. At the third round in the Americas, Rossi suffered his first DNF since the 2014 Aragon Grand Prix, bringing an end to a run of 24 consecutive top-five finishes after crashing at the start of the third lap at turn 2 when he lost the front of his M1 mid-corner.

In Spain, Rossi took pole position – his first since the Dutch round last year and his 52nd pole position overall – on Saturday, then led the race from start-to-finish with the exception of one corner to win. The race marked the first time in his MotoGP career that Rossi led every lap of a race from pole position. At the French round, Rossi started a lowly seventh on the grid but recovered in the race, overtaking both Márquez and Dovizioso in the process to finish second with the fastest lap of the race, the race being won by Yamaha teammate Lorenzo. Rossi suffered an engine failure on his home race in Italy when battling Lorenzo for the lead after starting from pole position. It was Rossi's first technical failure since the 2007 San Marino Grand Prix.

Rossi bounced back in Catalunya by winning from seventh on the first lap after a late-race battle with Márquez. Rossi dedicated the victory to the family of former Moto2 rider Luis Salom, who had been killed following a crash during Friday practice. The first race held on Sunday at the Dutch race saw disappointment for Rossi as wet conditions saw him fall from a comfortable lead in a restarted race following a red flag in torrential conditions. Assuming the lead in the second race, Rossi set the fastest lap and continued to push before crashing due to what he called a "stupid mistake". More rain at the German round saw Rossi in contention for victory again. However, a delayed decision to change bikes in the drying conditions, combined with using intermediate tyres instead of slicks like Márquez, saw him come home eighth.

After the summer break, MotoGP's return to Austria for the first time since 1997 saw the Factory Ducati riders dominate for a 1–2 finish, Rossi coming home a close fourth behind Jorge Lorenzo. Another wet race in the Czech Republic saw Rossi go against the majority of the field in choosing the harder rear wet tyre. Initially it seemed an error as he fell from 6th to 12th but he recovered throughout the race to finish second to Cal Crutchlow. Great Britain saw Rossi line up second on the grid behind pole-sitter Crutchlow and following an intense battle with Márquez, eventually finishing third behind Crutchlow and first-time race winner Maverick Viñales. A week later Rossi finished second at his "home race" in San Marino. After leading for the majority of the race he was overhauled by Dani Pedrosa in the closing laps. Rossi again led for a period in Aragón before eventually finishing third.

The flyaway races began badly for Rossi after he crashed out of second place in Japan, having started from pole. Victory for Márquez saw the Spaniard crowned champion with three races remaining. Rossi started in fifteenth spot at the Australian race after a rain affected qualifying but recovered to finish second in the race. Rossi secured second place once more in wet conditions in Malaysia behind Andrea Dovizioso having again led for periods of the race, the result securing second place in the championship for the third year in a row. The season concluded in the same fashion as 2015 did, with fourth place in Valencia after a long battle with Iannone.

Rossi finished second in the championship with 249 points, 49 points behind champion Marc Márquez.

2017

Rossi suffered a difficult winter testing period for the 2017 season, often lagging behind new teammate Maverick Viñales after suffering with a new, softer construction Michelin front tyre.

For the season opener in Qatar however, he appeared to make a breakthrough, moving from tenth on the grid to finish third. Rossi continued his improvement by taking back-to-back second place podiums in Argentina after a battle with Cal Crutchlow for second place and the Americas to take the lead of the championship after three races by six points.

The European season began disappointingly with a lowly tenth position at the Spanish round whilst Honda rider Dani Pedrosa won the race from pole. At the next race in France, Rossi crashed out of the race on the last lap while battling with teammate Viñales for the win. Rossi also lost the championship lead after the race. Following the French round, Rossi suffered a motocross training crash and had mild thoracic and abdominal trauma, but no fractures were detected in any part of the body and no serious traumatic pathologies were found. This crash initially threatened his participation at Mugello, but ultimately he passed a late fitness test and was deemed fit to race. At his home race in Italy, Rossi finished just off the podium in fourth, blaming his lack of energy due to his motocross training crash a week earlier which prevented him from scoring said podium. A week later in Catalunya, both Yamaha riders struggled as they did in Jerez in the hot conditions with Rossi and Viñales only able to finish eighth and tenth.

Tests of a new chassis after the Catalan race were positive and saw Rossi take his first and only win of the season at the Dutch round after a late-race battle with the Pramac Ducati of Danilo Petrucci, who ran slick tyres on a damp track, the older Italian prevailing by just 0.063 seconds. The result also made Rossi the oldest race winner in the MotoGP era, surpassing Troy Bayliss. After his win in Assen, Rossi underperformed at the next three rounds in Germany, the Czech Republic and Austria, finishing in fifth, fourth and seventh positions.

Rossi returned on the podium in Great Britain, leading for much of the race but ultimately having to concede the win to Dovizioso and second to Viñales with three laps to go. After the race at Silverstone, Rossi suffered another motocross crash in late August where he suffered displaced fractures of the tibia and fibula of his right leg. He suffered these injuries on the same leg that he previously broke in his high-speed crash at Mugello in 2010 and put him out of contention, requiring surgery and missing his "home race" in San Marino.

After missing out on the race in Misano, Rossi returned in Aragón to finish an impressive fifth after lining up at the front row of the grid on Saturday. In Japan, he went on to record his second retirement of the season when he crashed out of the wet early on in the race. At the Australian GP, Rossi scored his final podium of the season by finishing in second place, fighting hard with Tech 3 Yamaha rider Johann Zarco and finishing ahead of teammate Viñales by just 0.016 seconds. Rossi finished the season with disappointing results at the Malaysian and Valencian Community rounds, only being able to score seventh and fifth.

Rossi finished fifth in the championship with 208 points – his lowest position since his final season with Ducati in 2012 – 90 points behind champion Marc Márquez.

2018

Before the start of the season-opening race in Qatar, Rossi announced he had extended his contract at the Factory Yamaha team until 2020, when he will be 41 years old.

During the pre-season tests, Rossi and Viñales once again struggled with their 2018 Yamaha YZR-M1 competitor. Both riders were concerned about corner-entry and corner-exit issues as well as the lack of traction and tyre temperature.

At the first round in Qatar, Rossi started off well by getting a first podium of the season in the form of third place. He had a good start from eighth on the grid to move up to fourth on the opening lap, overtook the Honda of Dani Pedrosa on the second lap and made his move on the other Honda of Marc Márquez with 17 laps to go. However, he went wide at turn one on lap 11 and allowed Márquez and Andrea Dovizioso past. With five laps to go, Rossi muscled his way past the Tech 3 Yamaha of Johann Zarco but eventually couldn't get close enough and crossed the line 0.797 seconds behind eventual race winner Dovizioso. In Argentina, Rossi finished outside of the points in nineteenth place after a collision with the Honda of Márquez, who was storming through the field after starting from the back, when his bike stalled as a result of the crash. Márquez went up the inside of multiple riders, clashing with the Aprilia of Aleix Espargaró first and later with Rossi. When the Spaniard misjudged the braking point, he forced Rossi to go wide, making him clip the grass and fall in the process. Rossi eventually got going again, but failed to score any points afterwards. After the race, Rossi accused Márquez of "destroying our sport" because he "doesn't have any respect for his rivals" and Márquez received a 30-second penalty for the action. At the following rounds at the Americas and Spain, Rossi finished off the podium twice in fourth and fifth place, but he bounced back by scoring three consecutive third-place podiums at the French, Italian and Catalan rounds. At Mugello, he scored his first and only pole position of the season – his first since the 2016 Japanese GP and his 51st MotoGP pole position overall.

Rossi only finished fifth at the Dutch round but managed to score his first and only second place of the season in Germany, 2.196 seconds behind winner Márquez, claiming he finished so high on a track that usually doesn't suit the Yamaha's because he "studied everything" from the then-absent Jonas Folger. After his podium finish at the Sachsenring, Rossi finished off the podium again at the Czech Republic and Austria races in fourth and sixth place.

With the race in Great Britain cancelled due to heavy rain which failed to drain properly on the newly repaved Silverstone surface, Rossi failed to finish on the podium for five consecutive races. He finished the San Marino race in seventh, the Aragón race in eighth, the Thai and Japanese races in fourth and the Australian race in sixth.

Rossi's best chance at a victory came at the penultimate round of the season in Malaysia. He took the lead going into the first corner from P2 after poleman Zarco made a poor start and built up a gap, but Márquez stormed up through the field and the gap between them was 1.1 seconds with ten laps to go. Rossi pushed hard to keep the gap above 1 second but Márquez dipped below to 0.7 seconds with five laps to go. Many were preparing for a Rossi-Márquez battle when Rossi lost the front of his M1 bike with four laps to go at turn 1. Márquez won the race, with Rossi remounting and finishing nineteenth, outside the points. At the Valencian Community round, Rossi moved up the order from sixteenth on the grid in the wet conditions, being helped by some of the front runners crashing out in the ever-worsening conditions. When the race was stopped, Rossi was forced to use a used rear tyre, which he claimed "made the difference" as he was "more in trouble with the rear". As the race restarted, Rossi crashed out of second place.

Rossi finished third in the championship with 198 points, 123 points behind champion Marc Márquez. This was Rossi's first winless season since 2012 when he raced with Ducati and his first ever winless season with the Factory Yamaha team.

2019
During the pre-season tests, both Yamaha riders had mixed feelings of the 2019 YZR-M1. There were signs that showed that some of the problems, such as the lack of traction and degradation of the tyres, were less of an issue this year. However, at the Sepang tests, Rossi said he was only "half-happy" with the results, claiming, "some things worked well and we improved our performance, other things from which we expected a lot unfortunately didn't bring us what we need."

At the opening round in Qatar, Rossi lined up fourteenth on the grid on Saturday but stormed through the field to finish in fifth at the line, +0.600 seconds behind race winner Andrea Dovizioso. At the next race in Argentina, he rode a strong race where he battled with the Ducati of Dovizioso, overtaking him on the last lap to finish second, his first podium since the 2018 German round. At the third round in the Americas, Rossi again finished second after Marc Márquez crashed out of the race and Rossi was overtaken by the Suzuki of Álex Rins with four laps to go. Eventually, Rins crossed the line 0.462 seconds ahead of Rossi to win his first ever MotoGP race. After the good results in Argentina and the U.S., Rossi only managed to finish in sixth and fifth place in Spain and France.

In the next three rounds, Rossi registered three consecutive retirements – the first time in his career. In Italy, he crashed out after clipping the back of Joan Mir's Suzuki and ran across the gravel at Turn 4. He recovered and tried to regain the lost ground but eventually slid off again at the high-speed Arrabiata 2 corner to register his first DNF since the 2017 Japanese race. In Catalunya, Rossi – despite qualifying well on Saturday in fifth – was again forced to retire after an error by Jorge Lorenzo on lap 2 led to a freak accident in which Lorenzo, Rossi, teammate Viñales and Andrea Dovizioso were all involved. When Lorenzo tried to dive down the inside of Dovizioso at Turn 10, he lost the bike and collected Dovizioso, which in turn took out Viñales. Rossi was forced to go wide and initially survived a minor hit of Lorenzo's stricken bike, only to hit it again and fall onto the tarmac this time. The bike was damaged as a result and Rossi was unable to continue. In the Netherlands, Rossi registered his third DNF when he crashed and took out Takaaki Nakagami at Turn 8 on lap 4, the race being won by his teammate Viñales.

After these disastrous results, the next races went better for him. At the German and Czech rounds, Rossi managed to score an eighth and sixth place. He then scored three consecutive fourth places in Austria, which was the scene of the dramatic last-lap battle between Dovizioso and Màrquez, Great Britain and his home race in San Marino. Two eighth-place finishes followed for the Italian in Aragón and Thailand.

At the Japanese race, another retirement came for Rossi. He crashed out of a lowly eleventh place at Turn 1 with four laps to go. This was Rossi's fourth DNF of the season, equalling his 1998 season and the highest amount in his MotoGP career. Rossi ended the season only being able to score points: he finished in eighth place in Australia, fourth place in Malaysia – narrowly losing out on the podium but taking the fastest lap of the race – and eighth again in Valencia.

Rossi finished seventh in the championship with 174 points, 246 points behind champion Marc Márquez. This was Rossi's lowest championship position since 2011 when he raced for Ducati and marked his second winless season.

2020

In October 2019, Rossi announced he would be changing his crew chief. Silvano Galbusera, who has been Rossi's crew chief since 2014, will be replaced by David Muñoz for the 2020 season. The reason stated for this change was because of the poor results Rossi obtained during the 2019 season.

Rossi's future at the factory Yamaha team was uncertain after the rather poor results he had obtained the previous year. His initial plan was to wait for a handful of races in 2020 to see how competitive he still is because he has not won a race since 2017 and because of his lackluster 2019 season. However, because of the outbreak of the COVID-19 pandemic and subsequent delay of the start of the season, Rossi did not get the five or six races he hoped for. The team had asked him at the beginning of the year to make a decision regarding his future for reasons dictated by the riders' market, but ended the negotiations after his decision and chose Fabio Quartararo to line up beside Viñales for the 2021 season. This has left Rossi with a vacant seat but Yamaha's Lin Jarvis has already said that the team wants to supply him with a full factory bike and support. In July 2020, Rossi said that he is "99% certain" he will ride for the SIC Racing Team even though no contract has been signed yet, and that he'll make the decision either in August or September 2020. Rossi has also said he wants to continue racing in 2021, but that both he and SIC team boss Razlan Razali had doubts after the poor weekend in Spain. However, after Rossi's podium at the second race in Andalucia, these doubts were put to rest.

At the pre-season tests, the 2020 Yamaha YZR-M1 had improved considerably compared to the 2019 counterpart. The new engine had fixed most of the deficit that the riders suffered from in 2018 and 2019 and the handling was improved as well thanks to an updated chassis. Both the Factory as well as the SIC satellite riders were happy with the feeling of this year's bike and Rossi said that the bike has "a very good feeling" but that he personally worries he'll struggle with the tyres after around five to six laps and is disappointed the Yamaha is still losing out to the competitors on the straights. He also commented that the updated Michelin tyres suit the bike, as well as his riding style, a lot more compared to last year.

Rossi's first race was supposed to start in Qatar but was cancelled due to the outbreak of the COVID-19 virus. After a three-month delay, the season finally got underway in Spain. At this race, Rossi ran in tenth position before retiring with technical problems. The race was won by satellite rider Quartararo for the first time in his MotoGP career. At the same venue one week later in Andalucia, the Italian took his first podium since Austin. After qualifying in a strong fourth on Saturday, Rossi found himself in a fierce battle for second place with teammate Maverick Viñales after multiple riders either crashed out or had technical issues. Eventually, after outbraking himself, he lost second to Viñales but came home third to pick up his 199th podium in his motorcycle racing career. At the following two rounds in the Czech Republic and Austria, he came home in fifth place but only managed to come home ninth in the Styrian GP. Following a fourth place in the first race at his home Grand Prix in Misano, Rossi had three consecutive retirements, crashing out in the early stages of the second race at Misano and Le Mans, and while challenging Quartararo for a potential race win in Barcelona.

On 15 October 2020, he tested positive for COVID-19, which forced him to miss the Aragon and Teruel GP's. Six members of the factory Yamaha team were quarantined as one member had already tested positive earlier in October 2020. Having recovered from COVID-19, Rossi raced at the European GP but retired, on 12 November, Rossi tested positive for COVID-19 for a second time. However, further tests confirmed that the previous test was a false positive and he was allowed to participate in the final two races of the season.

Petronas Yamaha SRT (2021) 

In September 2020, after six months of speculation, Rossi confirmed that he would be joining Petronas Yamaha SRT for the 2021 season alongside his VR46 Academy protégé Franco Morbidelli. This is the first time that Rossi raced with a satellite team since 2001 – which was when he clinched his first-ever premier class world title. Despite being a non-factory rider, Rossi still received factory-supported machinery for his season at Petronas Yamaha SRT. In this team he had five different teammates in a season, namely Franco Morbidelli, Garrett Gerloff, Cal Crutchlow, Jake Dixon, and Andrea Dovizioso.

Retirement from motorcycle racing
On 5 August 2021, during the pre-event press conference of the 2021 Styrian motorcycle Grand Prix weekend, he announced that he would retire from MotoGP after the 2021 season. That would mark the end of Valentino Rossi's career era in MotoGP. His last race was the 2021 Valencian Community motorcycle Grand Prix, and he was congratulated for a successful career by various celebrities and prominent racing figures such as Lewis Hamilton and Max Verstappen, as well as former rival Casey Stoner. Rossi's number 46 was retired with a ceremony at the 2022 Italian motorcycle Grand Prix.

Sportscar racing
During his MotoGP career, Rossi had participated in some car racing events like the Gulf 12 Hours in 2019 and 2020, usually driving a Ferrari. On 13 January 2022, it was announced that Rossi would be racing for Team WRT in the GT World Challenge Europe Endurance Cup in 2022, driving an Audi R8 LMS.

Team WRT (2022) 

In January 2022, Team WRT announced that Rossi would join its driver line-up in the Fanatec GT World Challenge Europe Powered by AWS for the 2022 season. Rossi started his professional career on four wheels with the Belgian squad, which is the reigning champion team in the Fanatec GTWCE Powered by AWS (overall, Endurance and Sprint). Rossi will be competing in both the Endurance and the Sprint Cups, driving an Audi R8 LMS sporting the emblematic #46 in the Pro Cup class. He has been paired with Audi factory drivers Nico Müller and Frédéric Vervisch for his first full-time foray in sportscar racing, the former being an endurance co-driver for the team.

In his first race at Imola, Rossi finished in 17th place overall due to a miscommunication causing him to overshoot his pit box; despite this issue Rossi stated he "enjoyed every moment". At the next round in Brands Hatch, the first Sprint round of the championship, he finished Race 1 and Race 2 in 13th and 8th places respectively. In the following 6 rounds of the championship, Rossi and his teammates achieved 4 overall top ten finishes, three of them being 5th place finishes. His WRT Team currently sits 2nd in the teams' championship in GTWCE, with 181.5 points.

2023

After being with Audi for 13 years, starting the 2023 season WRT switched to BMW. This Belgian team will use the BMW M4 GT3. WRT has confirmed the switch to BMW for the GT3 program in 2023. The squad started testing by compiling a list of drivers, including Valentino Rossi. Rossi himself confirmed that he will continue to race in 2023 with WRT. He continued his sportscar career by staying at WRT which now uses a BMW in its pursuit of Le Mans 24 Hours.

24H GT Series

Rossi competed in the 24H Series race. He teams up with Sean Gelael, Maxime Martin, Max Hesse, and Tom Whale on the KFC VR46 with Team WRT.

The five of them drove the BMW M4 GT3, according to the class they participated in, namely the GT3. The GT3 class is attended by 20 cars which is the most from all classes.

In the first race in Dubai, he and his colleagues managed to seals the third podium.

Rivalries

1990s and early 2000s: Capirossi, Biaggi and Gibernau

Loris Capirossi
In the late 1990s and early 2000s, especially during his 250cc career, Rossi's main rival was fellow Italian Loris Capirossi. They often fought hard between each other during the races – with 1999 Assen, 2003 Catalunya and 2006 Mugello as examples – they always maintained a level of fairness on and off the track.

Their rivalry died down when Capirossi stopped consistently battling for podiums and eventually retired from MotoGP racing completely in 2011.

Max Biaggi
At the early stages of his 500cc career, Max Biaggi was considered Rossi's main rival. Rossi often found himself battling on the track with Capirossi and Biaggi, dubbing them "the three musketeers" by the Italian press. While the rivalry with Capirossi never escalated and the two always were on good terms with each other, the rivalry with Biaggi had been growing since the mid-1990s, even though both didn't race against each other until the 2000 season when Rossi first joined the 500cc class.

Before the first race of the 2001 season even started, Rossi and Biaggi had already had a heated argument when Biaggi encountered Rossi at a restaurant in Suzuka and told him to "wash your mouth out before saying my name". At the first round of the season in Japan, one of the most famous episodes in their rivalry took place when Biaggi seemed to have tried to push Rossi into the dirt at high speed and a few laps later Rossi overtook Biaggi and showed, on live television, his middle finger to him. Their rivalry reached its peak two months later at the 2001 Catalan round when at the end of the 500cc race, Rossi and Biaggi came to blows (involving members of their entourage and circuit employees) in the moments before the podium ceremony. Neither rider admitted that they got into a fist fight, but Biaggi appeared in the post-race press conference with red marks and scratches on his face, which he said "must have been caused by a mosquito bite". Rossi claimed that the incident happened because Biaggi bumped into his manager as both riders prepared to go up to the podium with third-place finisher Loris Capirossi.

Two weeks later at the next Grand Prix in Assen, Honda organized a press conference to put the events of Barcelona behind them. Rossi and Biaggi talked about the event and shook hands in front of the media, which ended the feud. After that, although they have had run-ins on track over the next couple of seasons, the media frenzy surrounding them and any incidents off-track calmed down, mainly due to Rossi's consecutive World Championships and Biaggi's struggle to find support and a consistent rhythm with his races, even after switching to the Honda Pons and later the Factory Honda team.

Some would also consider the 2004 South African round another key point in the rivalry due to the switch Rossi made from the Factory Honda to the Factory Yamaha team, with many believing that Biaggi would have the upper hand for the season due to the advantage the Honda had over its competitors at the time. During the race, Rossi and Biaggi fought hard but eventually, Rossi crossed the line 0.210 seconds ahead of Biaggi, dealing a critical psychological blow to Biaggi, with Rossi calling the race "one of the best of his career".

In his autobiography What If I'd Never Tried It?, Rossi makes a number of claims about the reasons for his rivalry with Biaggi, and some of the incidents which led to its escalation. The rivalry was also featured in the 2003 documentary film, Faster.

Sete Gibernau
Rossi's closest rival in the 2003 and 2004 seasons was Sete Gibernau, riding for the Gresini Team Movistar Honda on a satellite RC211V in 2004 and then on an all but in name factory RC211V, which Gibernau helped to develop, in 2005. Initially they were quite friendly in the paddock and off – Gibernau partied on occasions with Rossi at the Italian's Ibiza villa – but a souring in their relationship began in the 2004 season and culminated in the "Qatar Incident" that same season when Rossi's team was penalized for "cleaning" his grid position to aid in traction, along with Honda Pons' Max Biaggi, and both riders were subsequently forced to start from the back of the grid. A number of teams, including Gibernau's Team Gresini and the official Repsol Honda factory team, appealed successfully to race direction for Rossi to be sanctioned. Rossi and his chief engineer, Jeremy Burgess, insisted that they were doing nothing more than what many others had done before when faced with a dirty track and Rossi accused Gibernau of being behind the move to appeal for a sanction, something the Spaniard categorically denied. Rossi accused Gibernau in 2015 that he was "playing a dirty game".

Since then the two have not spoken and Rossi seemed to use the incident to apply psychological pressure on Gibernau. Rumours of Rossi having sworn that after the Qatar race, which Gibernau won while Rossi crashed out after rising to 6th position, he would do everything to make sure that Gibernau never stood on the highest step of the podium again. However, Rossi has denied these claims.

The rivalry between Rossi and Gibernau climaxed at the 2005 round in Jerez. Rossi started from pole position but Gibernau overtook him on the first lap. On the final lap, Gibernau was in the lead, but Rossi tried to overtake him at the final corner – the Dry Sack hairpin – with both colliding mid-corner. Gibernau ran wide and would finish second whilst Rossi would win the race. After the incident, Gibernau was furious and refused to comment on the last lap. The Spanish crowd booed Rossi as the Italian national anthem was playing to celebrate his victory. Rossi commented on the incident, stating that his move had been "hard" but also, "motorbike races sometimes are like this."

Tensions ended when Gibernau retired from Grand Prix racing after an unsuccessful, injury-blighted 2006 season with Ducati and he never won another race after Qatar, prompting some in the Spanish and Italian motorcycle racing media to explain this fact by way of reference to the "Qatar Curse".

Late 2000s and early 2010s: Stoner and Lorenzo

Casey Stoner
Casey Stoner emerged as a rival for Rossi when he moved from the LCR team in 2006 to the official Factory Ducati team in 2007. Over the course of the season, Rossi and Stoner frequently battled for wins – particularly in Catalunya and China – but the young Australian had the better of Rossi in many of the races thanks to the strong Ducati and Bridgestone combination and the underperforming Yamaha Rossi had, resulting in his claiming of the 2007 MotoGP World Championship title.

Stoner's and Rossi's rivalry came to a dramatic climax at the 2008 United States GP. After numerous position changes, Rossi overtook Stoner at the Corkscrew. The move caused Rossi to run into the dirt and broken pavement on the inside of the right turn, and his rejoining the track came close to causing a collision between the two riders. A few laps later, Stoner went into the gravel on the slow entry into turn 11 whilst outbraking himself, almost crashing into Rossi in the process. Stoner picked up his bike to finish second, while Rossi took the win. 
When Rossi wanted to shake Stoner's hand in the parc fermé, he angrily refused. At the press conference, Stoner claimed that some of Rossi's moves were considered "aggressive" but Rossi called it "just racing". After this, Casey Stoner made the comment "I have lost respect for one of the greatest riders in history." For the comment, Stoner apologised to Rossi at the next race.

The rivalry cooled down when Rossi won back-to-back titles in 2008 and 2009 whilst Stoner struggled with the Ducati for multiple seasons, suffered from a mystery illness and various crashes – despite still battling hard with Rossi on some occasions.

After Rossi moved to the Factory Ducati team and Stoner to the Factory Honda team in 2011, tensions would once again rise at the 2011 Spanish round when Rossi collided with Stoner, causing him to crash out of the race while Rossi got going again and finished fifth. After the race, Rossi went to Stoner to apologise for the incident, who smiled and accepted Rossi's handshake. However, Stoner told Rossi "your ambition outweighs your talent" during the brief exchange, in which he also asked about Rossi's shoulder. Stoner later apologised for this comment. After this, tensions between both riders would ease once more when Stoner won his 2011 World Championship title whilst Rossi struggled on an underperforming Ducati for the rest of the season.

However, tensions would rise once more at the 2012 French race where Rossi and Stoner once again came to blows when they battled hard in the wet conditions, with Rossi passing and repassing Stoner on the first corners of the Le Mans track before he permanently overtook him on the last lap to cross the line in second place. When Rossi caught Stoner, he thought of his mistake in Jerez last year and was more cautious because of it.

Rossi and Stoner's rivalry ended permanently when Stoner retired in 2012 and Rossi returned to the Factory Yamaha team in 2013.

Jorge Lorenzo

In 2008, Jorge Lorenzo joined Rossi in the Factory Yamaha team which started a new rivalry. Initially, relationships were friendly; Rossi won the 2008 title while Lorenzo suffered two serious crashes at Shanghai and Laguna Seca which prevented any serious rivalries from ever starting to begin with, Rossi concentrated more on his rivalry with Casey Stoner at the time.

In 2009, Rossi and Lorenzo resumed hostilities with Rossi emerging as champion again. Over the course of the season, Rossi defeated Lorenzo in several tight battles – such as Assen, Sachsenring, Valencia and, most memorably, Lorenzo's home race in Catalunya. Both were battling hard on the Catalan circuit, with Lorenzo taking the lead on the final lap. Rossi tried to overtake him in the usual spots but failed, with many assuming Lorenzo was going to win the race. However, Rossi managed to pass him going into the final corner, where many assumed overtaking was impossible, to take an unlikely victory.

In 2010, Lorenzo finally emerged victorious in the championship battle after Rossi first injured his shoulder at a motocross accident two weeks before the 2010 Spanish race and then suffered a displaced compound fracture of his right tibia during a free practice fall at the 2010 Italian round, which caused him to miss four races. The most dramatic race of the season came at Motegi when Rossi fought hard with Lorenzo on the final laps of the race for third place, colliding with each other on more than one occasion. Rossi would win the battle, crossing the line in third.

After Rossi moved to the Factory Ducati team in 2011, Lorenzo stayed with the Factory Yamaha team and the rivalry cooled down when Rossi underperformed on the Ducati for two seasons while Lorenzo fought for the championship in both years, losing out to Stoner in 2011 but winning his second MotoGP title in 2012.

After Rossi returned to Yamaha in 2013, the rivalry resumed, and came to a boiling point in 2015. Rossi was on course to win his tenth overall title but was narrowly ahead of his teammate Lorenzo, who had closed the gap after the summer break. Going into the penultimate round in Malaysia, Rossi and Márquez had a falling out, causing Márquez to fall and Rossi to resume, finishing third. This decision led to the race direction imposing three penalty points to Rossi and demoting him to the back of the grid at the final round in Valencia. This was crucial for Rossi's title chances because Lorenzo started on pole and won the race while he crossed the line in fourth place, handing the title to Lorenzo by just five points. Rossi accused both Márquez and Lorenzo, calling this title "a Spanish stitch-up" and "having Marc Márquez as the bodyguard of Lorenzo is embarrassing."

After this, the relationship between Rossi and Lorenzo became sour, though would ease once more when Lorenzo moved to the Factory Ducati team in 2017 whilst Rossi stayed with the team. In the subsequent seasons the rivalry cooled down as Andrea Dovizioso emerged as the main challenger to Marc Marquez starting with 2017. Rossi only won 1 race since then and Lorenzo 3 all coming in 2018 with Ducati after initially struggling with his new team.
The rivalry ended when Lorenzo retired from the sport at the end of the 2019 season.

Mid to late 2010s: Marc Márquez

Marc Márquez
In more recent times, Rossi has been involved in an, at times, heated rivalry with Spanish rider Marc Márquez. Márquez moved up to the MotoGP category in 2013 and initially the two had a good relationship, with Márquez stating that Rossi had been his childhood idol and that it was a pleasure to battle with him. Their respect for each other took a turn during the 2015 season, starting with a late race collision whilst battling for the lead at the third round in Argentina. Márquez started from pole and created a gap at the opening stages of the race, but Rossi closed him down and a battle commenced. At turn 5, Márquez made contact with Rossi, which resulted in Márquez's bike hitting Rossi's rear tyre, causing him to fall. Márquez could not rejoin, and as a result, Rossi took his second win of the season. Both riders shrugged it off as a racing incident. A similar incident occurred at Assen several months later; Márquez lunged up the inside of Rossi at the final chicane on the final lap, Rossi picked the bike up and rode through the gravel, rejoined the track and won the race. Post-race Márquez seemed fairly unbothered by the incident, although his team did appeal the result.

Their relationship broke down completely after the penultimate round in Malaysia. Having had a poor season and being out of championship contention, Márquez won at Phillip Island whilst points leader Rossi was only fourth. A week later during the pre-event press conference in Malaysia, Rossi accused Marc of deliberately battling aggressively with him in Australia to cost him time and give an advantage to Rossi's teammate and championship rival Jorge Lorenzo. Tempers reached boiling point in the race, where Márquez ran wide early on, allowing Lorenzo through for second and then had a heated battle with Rossi which lasted for several laps. Coming into turn 14, Rossi ran Márquez to the outside of the corner and they collided at the edge of the track, knocking Márquez out of the race whilst Rossi carried on to finish third. Post-race, Rossi was penalised by three championship points and by starting from the back of the grid for the championship decider in Valencia. In that race, Rossi rode from the back to fourth, but Lorenzo took victory with Márquez second to claim the title by 5 points. Márquez was accused by fans to have deliberately defended Lorenzo for the whole race against his own teammate Dani Pedrosa and Rossi called this championship a "Spanish stitch-up".

Their relationship remained frosty for the beginning of 2016, but the feud came to an end when they shook hands after battling each other in Barcelona to remember Luis Salom, who died after crashing at high speed on the Catalan circuit. However, tempers would again flare two years later, once more in Argentina. Márquez was given a ride-through penalty after he stalled on the grid and retook his original starting position. Whilst riding back through the field in the late stages, he caught Rossi who was running in fifth place. He attempted to overtake into the final corner, but hit a damp patch and collided with Rossi, pushing him off the track and causing him to fall. Márquez crossed the line in fifth but was penalised a further 30 seconds for the incident. After the race, Marquez walked to Rossi's garage to apologise, but Rossi refused to receive him. Instead, one of Rossi's team asked Marquez to leave. Later, Rossi stated that Márquez "destroyed our sport" with his aggressive riding. He also said, "Marquez needs to get away from me and not look me in the face anymore."

After Argentina, the relationship between the two remained quite poor. At the 2018 San Marino race, Rossi refused to shake Márquez's hand and claimed, "We don't need to shake the hand. We don't have any problem." However, one year later at the 2019 Argentine GP, Rossi and Márquez once more shook each other's hands just before the podium ceremony, indicating that tensions between the riders have eased once more.

Nicknames

Since his early racing days Rossi has had numerous nicknames. In the beginning of his career he was known as "Rossifumi" because he was a big fan of Japanese riders, most notably Norifumi Abe, who made a spectacular debut in the 500cc class as a wildcard rider in Japan. Rossi saw the race when he was only 14 years old and became a fan of him, which led to him also wanting to become a grand prix motorcycle racing rider in the future. As such, the nickname is a tribute to him.

Another nickname Rossi had earlier on in his career, albeit not as known or popular, was "Valentinik". This name appeared around the days when he raced in the 250cc championship. The nickname comes from the comic of Donald Duck, in Italian called Paperino. In the comics, he transforms into an alter ego called Super Donald which in Italian translates to Paperinik. This version of Donald Duck sports a mask and a cape and looks just like a super hero, but unlike actual super heroes does not have any luck and wreaks destruction everywhere he goes. However, he also is a funny and likeable character. The nickname is a reference to this Italian superhero, which can also be translated to "Super Valentino".

Since Rossi started to dominate in the 500cc, later known as MotoGP, "The Doctor" has become the nickname of choice for Rossi. Although not common in English-speaking countries, the nickname is given to those as a sign of respect. Two theories prevail as to why Rossi uses this name. One is that Rossi adopted the nickname upon having earned a degree, which in Italy entitles one to use the title "Doctor". Another, as spoken by Graziano Rossi himself, "The Doctor because, I don't think there is a particular reason, but it's beautiful, and is important, The Doctor. And in Italy, The Doctor is a name you give to someone for respect, it's very important, The Doctor... important." Rossi often jokes, however, that the name arrived because in Italy, Rossi is a common surname for doctors.

He has always raced with the number 46 in his motorcycle grand prix career, the number his father had raced with in the first of his three grand prix career wins in 1979, in Yugoslavia, on a 250c Morbidelli. Typically, a World Championship winner is awarded the No. 1 sticker for the next season. However, in a homage to Britain's Barry Sheene, who was the first rider of the modern era to keep the same number (#7), Rossi has stayed with the now-famous No. 46 throughout his career, though as the world champion he has worn the No. 1 on the shoulder of his racing leathers.

The text on his helmet's visors refers to the name of his group of friends: "The Tribe of the Chihuahua", in Italian "Tribu Dei Chihuahua". This is also a reference to a tribe of natives found in the Mexican state of Chihuahua. The letters WLF on his leathers stand for "Viva La Figa", Italian for "Long Live Pussy". He has so far escaped any sanctions or ultimatums that he remove the letters because the "W" in "WLF" represents the two "V"s in "ViVa". Equally obvious is his success at escaping any disciplinary action from the FIM or Dorna Sports for having the letters so brazenly on the front neck area of his leathers. He traditionally also incorporates his favorite color (fluorescent yellow) into his leather designs. This has also earned him the nickname "Highlighter Pen".

Fellow motorcycle racer and former teammate Colin Edwards, as well as many well known riders, commentators and journalists have often referred to him as 'the GOAT' (Greatest of all Time).

Other motorsport activities

Suzuka 8 Hours
Apart from MotoGP, the motorcycle racing event that Valentino Rossi has participated is the FIM Endurance World Championship (EWC). However, he did not fully participate in the championship, but has participated in one of its series which is also a prestigious motorcycle race and the most physically and mentaly demanding, the Suzuka 8 Hours in Japan. He took part in the event in 2000, teaming up with Colin Edwards and riding a Honda. Unfortunately, they failed to finish. In 2001, Rossi and Edwards teamed up for revenge, and eventually won the title. He also became the first Italian rider in history to win the race.

Formula One

Rossi tested the Ferrari Formula One car in 2006 on 31 January 1 February, and 2 February at Valencia. The first test saw Rossi spin out on the damp track into the gravel trap, ending his day. On the second day, he posted the ninth fastest time of fifteen drivers, approximately one second behind Michael Schumacher, who himself was third fastest. Rossi lapped faster than seasoned drivers Red Bull Racing's Mark Webber and David Coulthard and Toyota F1's Jarno Trulli. On the final day of testing, Rossi was just a little more than a half second behind Schumacher's best time. Schumacher hailed Rossi as having immense talent and said he would be perfectly capable of moving to Formula One and being competitive immediately.

In May 2006, Rossi announced that he would be staying in MotoGP until he felt his work on the motorbike was "finished". Ferrari driver Schumacher said that he felt "saddened" by Rossi's decision but supported it. Rossi subsequently signed a new contract with Yamaha for the 2007 and 2008 seasons, then for 2009 and 2010.

In 2008, Rossi tested a Ferrari F2008 at Mugello Circuit on 20 and 21 November 2008, as a gift from Ferrari team principal Stefano Domenicali to celebrate his eighth world title. On the first day Rossi completed over 20 laps, and set a best time of 1:22.5, only 1.5 seconds off Kimi Räikkönen's best time set at Ferrari's previous Mugello test. The second day was interrupted by rain, but Rossi still managed to set a best time of 1:24.04.

In January 2010, Rossi has said that once he retires from motorcycle racing, he hopes to move into rallying. "There are not many changes in a man's body between 22 and 34 so I still have some time left. I would consider shifting to cars, probably rallying, after that before I finally decide to take it easy ... I know F1 would've been easier but by the time I finish MotoGP, I will be too old for F1." Stefano Domenicali, Ferrari's Formula One Team principal, however, reasserted his wish to have a third Ferrari on the F1 grid driven by Rossi, whilst confirming that Rossi would test an older Ferrari F1 car on 21 and 22 January 2010. At the aforementioned test at Circuit de Barcelona-Catalunya, Rossi once again drove a Ferrari F2008 on GP2 tyres, setting a best laptime within 0.1 seconds of Kimi Räikkönen's 2008 pole time.

In December 2019, Rossi got the chance to swap rides with six-time F1 world champion Lewis Hamilton at Circuit Ricardo Tormo, as part of a sponsor event. He completed several laps in a 2017 Mercedes AMG F1 W08 EQ Power+, while Hamilton rode a Yamaha YZR-M1, identical to the one Rossi rode in the 2019 MotoGP season. Press were locked out of the event, so laptimes weren't made public.

Rally
Beyond his interest in F1, Rossi's strong passion is for rallying. In Rossi's youth one of his heroes was WRC Champion Colin McRae. Rally legend McRae taught Rossi the basics of driving a rally car. The two competed against each other at the 2005 Monza Rally Show, with McRae driving a Skoda Fabia WRC and Rossi winning in a Subaru Impreza WRC. His first official foray into rallying came in 2002 at WRC Rally Great Britain in a Peugeot 206 WRC, in which he crashed out on the second stage (first non-superspecial stage). Rossi had competed in the Monza Rally Show several times in a Toyota Corolla WRC.

In October 2006 it was announced that Rossi would enter that year's Rally New Zealand, a WRC event, which was to run from 17 to 19 November. He competed in a Subaru Impreza WRC04 finishing 11th out of 39. In 2006 Rossi also won the Monza Rally Show driving a Ford Focus RS WRC 04. He beat the 2005 winner Rinaldo Capello by 24 seconds, winning five of the seven stages on his way. He also managed to outpace former WRC champion Didier Auriol by seven seconds in the head-to-head Master Show final. Rossi also announced at the 2006 Monza Rally Show, that he would be entering the 2007 Rally of Great Britain, however, he later opted out. At the 2007 Monza Rally, Rossi again took first place.

Rossi had been linked with a move to both Formula One and the World Rally Championship in 2007, having tested for Ferrari and competed in a number of rally events.

But Rossi decided to remain in MotoGP; "I have a contract with Yamaha until 2008," said Rossi. "When that finishes then we will see. What I am sure about is that I will ride until I'm 31 or 32 at most. I will look for new stimuli in the next few seasons, but for now I am fully motivated". Rossi signed a new two-year contract confirming he will be at Yamaha until 2010.  He originally planned to use the Impreza WRC2008 during his participation in the Rally GB in December 2008,  but decided to drive a Ford Focus RS WRC 07 instead. He finished the rally in 12th place, 13 minutes and 20.4 seconds behind eventual winner Sébastien Loeb.

In March 2010, the Italian minister Franco Frattini government awarded Rossi the first Winning Italy Award for the image he portrays of his country on an international level.

Blancpain Endurance Series
In 2012, Rossi participated in the Blancpain Endurance Series Pro-Am Cup with the Kessel Racing Team, driving Ferrari 458 Italia GT3. In that season he had only two races, the first series in Monza and the fifth series in the Nürburgring.

Gulf 12 Hour

Later in the same week after Rossi got the chance to swap rides with six-time F1 world champion Lewis Hamilton at Circuit Ricardo Tormo in a 2017 Mercedes AMG F1 W08 EQ Power+, Rossi competed in the 2019 Gulf 12 Hour at Yas Marina Circuit, behind the wheel of a Ferrari 488 GT3 ran by Kessel Racing. His co-drivers were his half-brother and Moto2 rider, Luca Marini, and Alessio Salucci. Rossi set the team's fastest laptime in qualifying, securing seventh place overall on the grid. Despite a shaky start with some lost positions, the team were in the lead of the Pro-Am class at the halfway point. A few technical issues in the Pro-class left the VR46 car in a battle for the final overall podium place with Spirit Race Team's Audi R8 LMS Evo. Rossi got into the car for the final stint and drove the car to an overall third place and a win in the Pro-Am class, despite picking up a five-second time penalty.

In January 2021, he and his co-drivers Luca Marini and Alessio Salucci competed in the 2020 Gulf 12 Hours, behind the wheel of a Ferrari 488 GT3 run by Kessel Racing which was held at the Bahrain International Circuit and won the third podium.

Motocross & Flat Track
Not only does he love the world of road racing and all-terrain car racing, Rossi is also known to love the motocross arena. In flat track racing, Rossi has won several times the 'La 100km dei Campioni' racing event which he holds at Motor Ranch every year and is attended by members of the VR46 Riders Academy and professional motorcycle racers from other events. In this race, Rossi has won three times, namely in 2016, 2018 and 2019.

GT World Challenge
Rossi competed in the GT World Challenge Europe in 2022 for Team WRT, driving an Audi R8 LMS in the endurance and sprint categories, and will sport the number 46, the same number he raced with in MotoGP.

24H Series
In 2023, Rossi competes in the 24H Series with KFC VR46 with WRT Team driving a BMW M4 GT3 car. In the first race in Dubai, he managed to get the third podium.

Bathurst 12-Hour 
Valentino Rossi is expected to feature at the Bathurst 12-Hour endurance race at Mount Panorama in Australia.

Racing academy
Rossi founded a racing school with the name VR46 Racing Academy. This academy is a place for training and growth of young Italian drivers which was founded in 2014 in Tavullia, Italy. The VR46 provides the experience and knowledge that Valentino Rossi has gained over the years of his career. VR46 Riders Academy has an experienced team. Alessio Salucci managed relations with the team, Alberto Tebaldi was responsible for logistics and external relations, Luca Brivio for the operational management of the drivers, Carlo Casabianca for physical preparation, Claudio Sanchioni for contractual aspects and Barbara Mazzoni for secretarial and administrative services.

Team ownership
Rossi is the owner of the junior-class team Sky Racing Team by VR46, which debuted in the Moto3 category of Grand Prix motorcycle racing in 2014 with riders Romano Fenati and Francesco Bagnaia with his former Cagiva teammate Vittoriano Guareschi as team manager. In 2015, Andrea Migno replaced Francesco Bagnaia and Guareschi was replaced by Alessio 'Uccio' Salucci and Carlo Alberto Tebaldi. The team also races in Moto2. In 2020, it was announced that Rossi's brand VR46 would back one machine from the Esponsorama Avintia team in the 2021 MotoGP season, to be ridden by his half-brother, Luca Marini.

VR46 Riders Academy began to reap the "investment" results through several academy drivers, including Franco Morbidelli who became the 2017 world champion and then finished as the 2020 MotoGP runner-up. This achievement was then repeated by Francesco Bagnaia who became the 2018 Moto2 world champion and then finished second in the 2021 MotoGP final standings. Until finally , Bagnaia ended the long wait for VR46 Academy by becoming the 2022 MotoGP world champion.

In addition, there are several other names who have managed to compete at the top of the standings, such as Luca Marini who was runner-up in Moto2 2020, Marco Bezzecchi who managed to get third in the final Moto2 2021 standings, and several other riders in academy. 

In the 2020 season, the Sky Racing VR46 won the Moto2 teams championship by taking first place in the final standings after leading the standings with 380 points.

Collaboration team
In addition to having their own team, Rossi also collaborates with several teams to attract young racers with several programs, including the following:

Team Bardahl VR46 Riders Academy
The team competes in the CIV Italian Championships Series in collaboration with Bardahl as the main sponsor. In the 2021 season the team got a wildcard to race in two Moto3 series, at Mugello and Misano. This team races using KTM bikes.

Yamaha VR46 MasterCamp Team
He also has a program for nurturing young riders called VR46 MasterCamp. The team collaborated with Yamaha under the name Yamaha VR46 MasterCamp and competed in the CEV Moto2 Championships for several years before. Starting 2022 season, this team will debuted in Moto2.

Avintia VR46 Riders Academy
Starting from the 2022 season, the VR46 Racing Team will also return to Moto3 and work closely with Esponsorama Racing. Then the Avintia Racing team changed its name to Avintia VR46 Riders Academy, the result of a collaboration between Avintia Racing and VR46 Riders Academy which is likely to place several VR46 racers in the team.

RMU Moto VR46 Academy
This team is the result of a collaboration between VR46 Riders Academy and RMU Moto from Italy. Compete in CIV PreMoto3 with young riders educated in VR46 Riders Academy.

Helmets and protective gear

Rossi has gone through numerous helmet designs throughout his career, most featuring the Sun & Moon motif, signifying (according to Rossi) the two sides of his personality. His helmets are manufactured by AGV. Aldo Drudi was associated with Rossi's helmet graphics in 2010. Nearly every year, Rossi works with Aldo Drudi to design a unique helmet to use while racing at the Italian and San Marino Grand Prix.

Since commencing his Grand Prix career, Rossi has worn leathers from Dainese. Alpinestars just supplied racing boots for Rossi. After Rossi joined the Yamaha Factory Team, the team wore shirts from Alpinestars, while Rossi maintained his association with Dainese. In 2016, Rossi has a new jacket from Dainese. His jacket has a different graphic compared with Alpinestars Movistar Yamaha jacket.

In March 2022 Rossi has announced a multi-year partnership with Racing Force Group, which would see Rossi use OMP race suit and Bell helmets in his car racing career.

Pre-ride rituals

Rossi is superstitious and renowned for his pre-ride rituals. On a race day, he will always watch the beginning of the Moto3 race to see how long the starting lights remain lit before going out at the start of the race. Prior to riding (whether racing, qualifying, or practice), he will start his personal ritual by stopping about two metres from his bike, bending over and reaching for his boots. Then, when arriving at his bike, he will crouch down and hold the right-side foot-peg, with his head bowed. In an interview, Rossi said "It's just a moment to focus and 'talk' to my bike, like moving from one place to the next." He adjusts the fit of his leathers by standing straight up on the foot-pegs, whilst riding down the pit-lane before the start of race or practice. He also revealed in an interview with MotoGP.com that he always puts one particular boot on before the other, as well as one particular glove on before the other, and that he always gets on the bike the same way. He also gets off the bike in the same way, swinging his right leg over the front of the bike.

Personal life
After leaving the family home in Tavullia, he moved to Milan, before taking up residency in London, England during his period with Honda. During this time he acquired a villa in Ibiza which he still owns, and following the tax case returned to his main residence to live close to his family in Italy. Rossi is a practising Catholic.

In 2002 he received threats from an Italian-Spanish anarchist movement, which in those days sent parcel bombs to people it considered targets in either of the two countries. The anarchists considered Rossi "guilty" because at the time he rode for Honda's MotoGP factory team, it had been sponsored by the oil company Repsol since 1994, (for which he filmed a commercial in Spain.) with their logo displayed on both the motorcycle and on his race suits.

On 31 May 2005 he received an honorary degree in Communications and Advertising for Organizations. In March 2010, the Italian Foreign Minister Franco Frattini delivered to Rossi the first Winning Italy Award for his contribution to the promotion of Italy's image in the world.

Rossi has a maternal half-brother, Luca Marini, 2020 Moto2 season runner-up who was racing for the Sky Racing Team by VR46. In 2021, Marini moved to the MotoGP class joining the Esponsorama Racing team using the Sky VR46 livery on his bike, before moving over to Rossi's VR46 Racing Team for the 2022 season.

On 4 March 2022, he had a daughter, Giulietta Rossi, with his partner, Francesca Sofia Novello.

Business 
Besides having a racing team, Rossi also has other businesses such as merchandise, apparel, and many other things with the VR46 brand. In Tavullia he also has a place of business with the name Tavullia 46. Tavullia 46 owns various entities such as pizza restaurants and ice cream shops.

Reported earnings
According to Sports Illustrated, Rossi is one of the highest-earning sports personalities in the world, having earned an estimated $34 million in 2007. In 2009 Forbes ranked Rossi as number nine among the world's highest-paid athletes having earned an estimated $35 million in the past year.

Tax avoidance case
In 2007, the Italian tax authorities declared Rossi was being investigated for suspected tax evasion. Having previously unsuccessfully investigated Rossi for tax evasion in 2002, the authorities announced they were investigating Rossi for undeclared revenues of 112 million euros ($160 million) between 2000 and 2004. The officials said, against the European Taxes Agreements among European countries, Rossi's London residency has enabled him to take advantage of favourable tax conditions, such as only declaring earnings made in Britain and avoiding taxes on his lucrative merchandising and sponsorship contracts, commenting that Rossi had residency in London but his "centre of interests" wasn't there, as shown by a thorough investigation. It noted that in 2002, Rossi's Italian tax form declared earnings of 500 euros, while sponsorship contracts were all reported to be made out to foreign companies, but with his affairs controlled mainly from Italy. In February 2008, Rossi announced that he had reached a settlement with the Italian tax authorities: he paid 35 million euros to close the tax case. He also plea-bargained a suspended sentence of six months' imprisonment for non-declaration of income.

Videogame
In November 2015, Milestone srl announced the development of Valentino Rossi: The Game, to be released for Microsoft Windows, PlayStation 4, and Xbox One, with Rossi officially endorsing the game. It was then released on 16 June 2016, and it is also the official video game of the 2016 MotoGP season.

Other hobbies
Rossi keeps his personal life private, though he makes no secret of his fondness for Italian football club Inter Milan. After he won world titles in 2008 and 2009, Inter congratulated him via their website. At the 2015 Argentine Grand Prix, Rossi wore a replica Diego Maradona football shirt on the podium in tribute to Maradona after Rossi won the race. Maradona congratulated him via his Facebook.

Career statistics and records

References

Bibliography

External links

Valentino Rossi Race Replica Leathers

Valentino Rossi
1979 births
Living people
People from Urbino
Italian motorcycle racers
500cc World Championship riders
250cc World Championship riders
125cc World Championship riders
Ducati Corse MotoGP riders
Repsol Honda MotoGP riders
Yamaha Motor Racing MotoGP riders
Italian rally drivers
Italian Roman Catholics
World Rally Championship drivers
Laureus World Sports Awards winners
Blancpain Endurance Series drivers
Motorcycle racing team owners
MotoGP World Championship riders
Sepang Racing Team MotoGP riders
Sportspeople from the Province of Pesaro and Urbino
Italian racing drivers
W Racing Team drivers
NASCAR drivers
500cc World Riders' Champions
MotoGP World Riders' Champions
250cc World Riders' Champions
125cc World Riders' Champions
24H Series drivers
BMW M drivers
M-Sport drivers